

361001–361100 

|-bgcolor=#d6d6d6
| 361001 ||  || — || October 22, 2005 || Kitt Peak || Spacewatch || EOS || align=right | 2.6 km || 
|-id=002 bgcolor=#d6d6d6
| 361002 ||  || — || October 23, 2005 || Palomar || NEAT || EUP || align=right | 5.3 km || 
|-id=003 bgcolor=#d6d6d6
| 361003 ||  || — || October 29, 2005 || Kitt Peak || Spacewatch || — || align=right | 3.4 km || 
|-id=004 bgcolor=#d6d6d6
| 361004 ||  || — || October 22, 2005 || Apache Point || A. C. Becker || — || align=right | 2.4 km || 
|-id=005 bgcolor=#d6d6d6
| 361005 ||  || — || October 22, 2005 || Apache Point || A. C. Becker || — || align=right | 3.2 km || 
|-id=006 bgcolor=#d6d6d6
| 361006 ||  || — || October 26, 2005 || Apache Point || A. C. Becker || — || align=right | 3.4 km || 
|-id=007 bgcolor=#d6d6d6
| 361007 ||  || — || October 25, 2005 || Kitt Peak || Spacewatch || — || align=right | 2.4 km || 
|-id=008 bgcolor=#d6d6d6
| 361008 ||  || — || November 4, 2005 || Kitt Peak || Spacewatch || CHA || align=right | 2.0 km || 
|-id=009 bgcolor=#d6d6d6
| 361009 ||  || — || November 4, 2005 || Kitt Peak || Spacewatch || THM || align=right | 2.0 km || 
|-id=010 bgcolor=#d6d6d6
| 361010 ||  || — || November 2, 2005 || Socorro || LINEAR || — || align=right | 3.7 km || 
|-id=011 bgcolor=#d6d6d6
| 361011 ||  || — || November 5, 2005 || Kitt Peak || Spacewatch || — || align=right | 3.0 km || 
|-id=012 bgcolor=#d6d6d6
| 361012 ||  || — || November 6, 2005 || Mount Lemmon || Mount Lemmon Survey || — || align=right | 1.9 km || 
|-id=013 bgcolor=#d6d6d6
| 361013 ||  || — || November 2, 2005 || Catalina || CSS || — || align=right | 4.2 km || 
|-id=014 bgcolor=#d6d6d6
| 361014 ||  || — || November 1, 2005 || Apache Point || A. C. Becker || KOR || align=right | 1.3 km || 
|-id=015 bgcolor=#d6d6d6
| 361015 ||  || — || November 1, 2005 || Apache Point || A. C. Becker || — || align=right | 2.9 km || 
|-id=016 bgcolor=#d6d6d6
| 361016 ||  || — || November 1, 2005 || Apache Point || A. C. Becker || — || align=right | 2.7 km || 
|-id=017 bgcolor=#d6d6d6
| 361017 ||  || — || November 22, 2005 || Kitt Peak || Spacewatch || — || align=right | 2.5 km || 
|-id=018 bgcolor=#d6d6d6
| 361018 ||  || — || September 30, 2005 || Mount Lemmon || Mount Lemmon Survey || EOS || align=right | 2.0 km || 
|-id=019 bgcolor=#d6d6d6
| 361019 ||  || — || November 22, 2005 || Kitt Peak || Spacewatch || — || align=right | 3.7 km || 
|-id=020 bgcolor=#d6d6d6
| 361020 ||  || — || November 25, 2005 || Mount Lemmon || Mount Lemmon Survey || — || align=right | 3.0 km || 
|-id=021 bgcolor=#fefefe
| 361021 ||  || — || November 21, 2005 || Kitt Peak || Spacewatch || — || align=right data-sort-value="0.58" | 580 m || 
|-id=022 bgcolor=#d6d6d6
| 361022 ||  || — || November 10, 2005 || Mount Lemmon || Mount Lemmon Survey || EOS || align=right | 2.2 km || 
|-id=023 bgcolor=#d6d6d6
| 361023 ||  || — || November 29, 2005 || Junk Bond || D. Healy || — || align=right | 2.5 km || 
|-id=024 bgcolor=#d6d6d6
| 361024 ||  || — || November 25, 2005 || Mount Lemmon || Mount Lemmon Survey || — || align=right | 2.5 km || 
|-id=025 bgcolor=#d6d6d6
| 361025 ||  || — || November 26, 2005 || Mount Lemmon || Mount Lemmon Survey || — || align=right | 2.7 km || 
|-id=026 bgcolor=#d6d6d6
| 361026 ||  || — || November 28, 2005 || Mount Lemmon || Mount Lemmon Survey || THB || align=right | 3.9 km || 
|-id=027 bgcolor=#d6d6d6
| 361027 ||  || — || November 22, 2005 || Kitt Peak || Spacewatch || — || align=right | 4.6 km || 
|-id=028 bgcolor=#d6d6d6
| 361028 ||  || — || November 26, 2005 || Kitt Peak || Spacewatch || — || align=right | 3.2 km || 
|-id=029 bgcolor=#d6d6d6
| 361029 ||  || — || November 26, 2005 || Kitt Peak || Spacewatch || — || align=right | 2.8 km || 
|-id=030 bgcolor=#d6d6d6
| 361030 ||  || — || November 12, 2005 || Kitt Peak || Spacewatch || — || align=right | 2.3 km || 
|-id=031 bgcolor=#d6d6d6
| 361031 ||  || — || November 29, 2005 || Socorro || LINEAR || LIX || align=right | 5.5 km || 
|-id=032 bgcolor=#fefefe
| 361032 ||  || — || November 29, 2005 || Mount Lemmon || Mount Lemmon Survey || — || align=right data-sort-value="0.82" | 820 m || 
|-id=033 bgcolor=#d6d6d6
| 361033 ||  || — || November 22, 2005 || Kitt Peak || Spacewatch || — || align=right | 2.4 km || 
|-id=034 bgcolor=#d6d6d6
| 361034 ||  || — || September 25, 2005 || Kitt Peak || Spacewatch || BRA || align=right | 1.5 km || 
|-id=035 bgcolor=#fefefe
| 361035 ||  || — || November 30, 2005 || Mount Lemmon || Mount Lemmon Survey || — || align=right data-sort-value="0.81" | 810 m || 
|-id=036 bgcolor=#d6d6d6
| 361036 ||  || — || November 26, 2005 || Mount Lemmon || Mount Lemmon Survey || — || align=right | 3.0 km || 
|-id=037 bgcolor=#d6d6d6
| 361037 ||  || — || November 28, 2005 || Socorro || LINEAR || THB || align=right | 4.5 km || 
|-id=038 bgcolor=#d6d6d6
| 361038 ||  || — || November 25, 2005 || Kitt Peak || Spacewatch || — || align=right | 3.8 km || 
|-id=039 bgcolor=#d6d6d6
| 361039 ||  || — || December 1, 2005 || Kitt Peak || Spacewatch || EOS || align=right | 2.3 km || 
|-id=040 bgcolor=#d6d6d6
| 361040 ||  || — || December 2, 2005 || Socorro || LINEAR || — || align=right | 3.7 km || 
|-id=041 bgcolor=#d6d6d6
| 361041 ||  || — || December 2, 2005 || Kitt Peak || Spacewatch || — || align=right | 3.6 km || 
|-id=042 bgcolor=#fefefe
| 361042 ||  || — || December 2, 2005 || Mount Lemmon || Mount Lemmon Survey || — || align=right data-sort-value="0.58" | 580 m || 
|-id=043 bgcolor=#d6d6d6
| 361043 ||  || — || December 6, 2005 || Kitt Peak || Spacewatch || — || align=right | 3.6 km || 
|-id=044 bgcolor=#d6d6d6
| 361044 ||  || — || November 25, 2005 || Catalina || CSS || EOS || align=right | 2.4 km || 
|-id=045 bgcolor=#d6d6d6
| 361045 ||  || — || November 9, 2005 || Campo Imperatore || CINEOS || — || align=right | 3.8 km || 
|-id=046 bgcolor=#d6d6d6
| 361046 ||  || — || December 10, 2005 || Kitt Peak || Spacewatch || — || align=right | 3.3 km || 
|-id=047 bgcolor=#d6d6d6
| 361047 ||  || — || October 1, 1999 || Kitt Peak || Spacewatch || — || align=right | 2.3 km || 
|-id=048 bgcolor=#fefefe
| 361048 ||  || — || December 22, 2005 || Kitt Peak || Spacewatch || — || align=right data-sort-value="0.69" | 690 m || 
|-id=049 bgcolor=#d6d6d6
| 361049 ||  || — || December 23, 2005 || Kitt Peak || Spacewatch || — || align=right | 3.9 km || 
|-id=050 bgcolor=#fefefe
| 361050 ||  || — || December 24, 2005 || Kitt Peak || Spacewatch || FLO || align=right data-sort-value="0.65" | 650 m || 
|-id=051 bgcolor=#fefefe
| 361051 ||  || — || December 24, 2005 || Kitt Peak || Spacewatch || FLO || align=right data-sort-value="0.56" | 560 m || 
|-id=052 bgcolor=#fefefe
| 361052 ||  || — || December 24, 2005 || Kitt Peak || Spacewatch || FLO || align=right data-sort-value="0.77" | 770 m || 
|-id=053 bgcolor=#fefefe
| 361053 ||  || — || December 24, 2005 || Kitt Peak || Spacewatch || — || align=right data-sort-value="0.77" | 770 m || 
|-id=054 bgcolor=#d6d6d6
| 361054 ||  || — || December 26, 2005 || Kitt Peak || Spacewatch || EUP || align=right | 5.6 km || 
|-id=055 bgcolor=#d6d6d6
| 361055 ||  || — || December 24, 2005 || Kitt Peak || Spacewatch || — || align=right | 3.0 km || 
|-id=056 bgcolor=#d6d6d6
| 361056 ||  || — || December 1, 2005 || Mount Lemmon || Mount Lemmon Survey || — || align=right | 3.2 km || 
|-id=057 bgcolor=#d6d6d6
| 361057 ||  || — || December 25, 2005 || Mount Lemmon || Mount Lemmon Survey || — || align=right | 3.4 km || 
|-id=058 bgcolor=#d6d6d6
| 361058 ||  || — || December 5, 2005 || Mount Lemmon || Mount Lemmon Survey || — || align=right | 4.2 km || 
|-id=059 bgcolor=#d6d6d6
| 361059 ||  || — || December 27, 2005 || Kitt Peak || Spacewatch || — || align=right | 2.9 km || 
|-id=060 bgcolor=#d6d6d6
| 361060 ||  || — || December 27, 2005 || Mount Lemmon || Mount Lemmon Survey || — || align=right | 3.8 km || 
|-id=061 bgcolor=#fefefe
| 361061 ||  || — || December 28, 2005 || Mount Lemmon || Mount Lemmon Survey || — || align=right data-sort-value="0.87" | 870 m || 
|-id=062 bgcolor=#d6d6d6
| 361062 ||  || — || December 28, 2005 || Kitt Peak || Spacewatch || EOS || align=right | 2.3 km || 
|-id=063 bgcolor=#d6d6d6
| 361063 ||  || — || December 27, 2005 || Kitt Peak || Spacewatch || — || align=right | 4.1 km || 
|-id=064 bgcolor=#d6d6d6
| 361064 ||  || — || December 30, 2005 || Kitt Peak || Spacewatch || — || align=right | 3.9 km || 
|-id=065 bgcolor=#fefefe
| 361065 ||  || — || December 28, 2005 || Catalina || CSS || — || align=right data-sort-value="0.92" | 920 m || 
|-id=066 bgcolor=#d6d6d6
| 361066 ||  || — || December 29, 2005 || Mount Lemmon || Mount Lemmon Survey || — || align=right | 4.8 km || 
|-id=067 bgcolor=#d6d6d6
| 361067 ||  || — || November 25, 2005 || Kitt Peak || Spacewatch || — || align=right | 2.8 km || 
|-id=068 bgcolor=#d6d6d6
| 361068 ||  || — || December 28, 2005 || Palomar || NEAT || — || align=right | 3.3 km || 
|-id=069 bgcolor=#d6d6d6
| 361069 ||  || — || December 25, 2005 || Kitt Peak || Spacewatch || — || align=right | 3.0 km || 
|-id=070 bgcolor=#d6d6d6
| 361070 ||  || — || December 25, 2005 || Mount Lemmon || Mount Lemmon Survey || EOS || align=right | 2.1 km || 
|-id=071 bgcolor=#FFC2E0
| 361071 ||  || — || January 8, 2006 || Mount Lemmon || Mount Lemmon Survey || AMO +1km || align=right | 3.0 km || 
|-id=072 bgcolor=#d6d6d6
| 361072 ||  || — || January 6, 2006 || Kitt Peak || Spacewatch || VERfast? || align=right | 3.4 km || 
|-id=073 bgcolor=#d6d6d6
| 361073 ||  || — || January 7, 2006 || Kitt Peak || Spacewatch || URS || align=right | 3.5 km || 
|-id=074 bgcolor=#fefefe
| 361074 ||  || — || September 20, 2001 || Socorro || LINEAR || — || align=right data-sort-value="0.81" | 810 m || 
|-id=075 bgcolor=#fefefe
| 361075 ||  || — || August 21, 2004 || Kitt Peak || Spacewatch || FLO || align=right data-sort-value="0.70" | 700 m || 
|-id=076 bgcolor=#d6d6d6
| 361076 ||  || — || January 23, 2006 || Mount Lemmon || Mount Lemmon Survey || — || align=right | 3.3 km || 
|-id=077 bgcolor=#fefefe
| 361077 ||  || — || January 20, 2006 || Kitt Peak || Spacewatch || — || align=right data-sort-value="0.77" | 770 m || 
|-id=078 bgcolor=#fefefe
| 361078 ||  || — || January 23, 2006 || Mount Lemmon || Mount Lemmon Survey || — || align=right | 1.2 km || 
|-id=079 bgcolor=#fefefe
| 361079 ||  || — || January 23, 2006 || Mount Lemmon || Mount Lemmon Survey || — || align=right data-sort-value="0.94" | 940 m || 
|-id=080 bgcolor=#d6d6d6
| 361080 ||  || — || January 25, 2006 || Kitt Peak || Spacewatch || — || align=right | 4.1 km || 
|-id=081 bgcolor=#fefefe
| 361081 ||  || — || January 25, 2006 || Kitt Peak || Spacewatch || — || align=right data-sort-value="0.61" | 610 m || 
|-id=082 bgcolor=#fefefe
| 361082 ||  || — || January 26, 2006 || Kitt Peak || Spacewatch || V || align=right data-sort-value="0.76" | 760 m || 
|-id=083 bgcolor=#fefefe
| 361083 ||  || — || January 25, 2006 || Kitt Peak || Spacewatch || — || align=right data-sort-value="0.67" | 670 m || 
|-id=084 bgcolor=#fefefe
| 361084 ||  || — || January 26, 2006 || Kitt Peak || Spacewatch || — || align=right data-sort-value="0.60" | 600 m || 
|-id=085 bgcolor=#fefefe
| 361085 ||  || — || January 26, 2006 || Kitt Peak || Spacewatch || — || align=right data-sort-value="0.74" | 740 m || 
|-id=086 bgcolor=#fefefe
| 361086 ||  || — || January 28, 2006 || Mount Lemmon || Mount Lemmon Survey || — || align=right data-sort-value="0.80" | 800 m || 
|-id=087 bgcolor=#fefefe
| 361087 ||  || — || January 28, 2006 || Kitt Peak || Spacewatch || — || align=right data-sort-value="0.86" | 860 m || 
|-id=088 bgcolor=#fefefe
| 361088 ||  || — || January 30, 2006 || Kitt Peak || Spacewatch || — || align=right data-sort-value="0.93" | 930 m || 
|-id=089 bgcolor=#fefefe
| 361089 ||  || — || January 31, 2006 || Kitt Peak || Spacewatch || — || align=right data-sort-value="0.77" | 770 m || 
|-id=090 bgcolor=#fefefe
| 361090 ||  || — || January 31, 2006 || Kitt Peak || Spacewatch || — || align=right data-sort-value="0.58" | 580 m || 
|-id=091 bgcolor=#fefefe
| 361091 ||  || — || January 31, 2006 || Kitt Peak || Spacewatch || — || align=right data-sort-value="0.88" | 880 m || 
|-id=092 bgcolor=#fefefe
| 361092 ||  || — || January 30, 2006 || Kitt Peak || Spacewatch || — || align=right data-sort-value="0.75" | 750 m || 
|-id=093 bgcolor=#d6d6d6
| 361093 ||  || — || January 30, 2006 || Kitt Peak || Spacewatch || — || align=right | 4.1 km || 
|-id=094 bgcolor=#FA8072
| 361094 ||  || — || February 2, 2006 || Jarnac || Jarnac Obs. || — || align=right data-sort-value="0.50" | 500 m || 
|-id=095 bgcolor=#fefefe
| 361095 ||  || — || January 5, 2006 || Catalina || CSS || PHO || align=right | 1.1 km || 
|-id=096 bgcolor=#d6d6d6
| 361096 ||  || — || February 18, 2006 || Pla D'Arguines || R. Ferrando, M. Ferrando || — || align=right | 4.3 km || 
|-id=097 bgcolor=#d6d6d6
| 361097 ||  || — || February 20, 2006 || Socorro || LINEAR || — || align=right | 4.7 km || 
|-id=098 bgcolor=#fefefe
| 361098 ||  || — || February 20, 2006 || Kitt Peak || Spacewatch || — || align=right data-sort-value="0.87" | 870 m || 
|-id=099 bgcolor=#fefefe
| 361099 ||  || — || February 20, 2006 || Kitt Peak || Spacewatch || FLO || align=right data-sort-value="0.70" | 700 m || 
|-id=100 bgcolor=#fefefe
| 361100 ||  || — || February 20, 2006 || Kitt Peak || Spacewatch || V || align=right data-sort-value="0.87" | 870 m || 
|}

361101–361200 

|-bgcolor=#fefefe
| 361101 ||  || — || February 24, 2006 || Mount Lemmon || Mount Lemmon Survey || — || align=right data-sort-value="0.97" | 970 m || 
|-id=102 bgcolor=#fefefe
| 361102 ||  || — || February 24, 2006 || Mount Lemmon || Mount Lemmon Survey || — || align=right | 1.0 km || 
|-id=103 bgcolor=#fefefe
| 361103 ||  || — || February 21, 2006 || Mount Lemmon || Mount Lemmon Survey || — || align=right data-sort-value="0.67" | 670 m || 
|-id=104 bgcolor=#fefefe
| 361104 ||  || — || February 25, 2006 || Kitt Peak || Spacewatch || — || align=right data-sort-value="0.67" | 670 m || 
|-id=105 bgcolor=#fefefe
| 361105 ||  || — || February 21, 2006 || Mount Lemmon || Mount Lemmon Survey || NYS || align=right data-sort-value="0.65" | 650 m || 
|-id=106 bgcolor=#fefefe
| 361106 ||  || — || February 24, 2006 || Mount Lemmon || Mount Lemmon Survey || NYS || align=right data-sort-value="0.63" | 630 m || 
|-id=107 bgcolor=#fefefe
| 361107 ||  || — || February 27, 2006 || Kitt Peak || Spacewatch || — || align=right data-sort-value="0.64" | 640 m || 
|-id=108 bgcolor=#fefefe
| 361108 ||  || — || February 28, 2006 || Catalina || CSS || — || align=right data-sort-value="0.73" | 730 m || 
|-id=109 bgcolor=#fefefe
| 361109 ||  || — || January 7, 2006 || Mount Lemmon || Mount Lemmon Survey || V || align=right data-sort-value="0.69" | 690 m || 
|-id=110 bgcolor=#fefefe
| 361110 ||  || — || February 28, 2006 || Mount Lemmon || Mount Lemmon Survey || — || align=right | 1.1 km || 
|-id=111 bgcolor=#fefefe
| 361111 ||  || — || February 24, 2006 || Mount Lemmon || Mount Lemmon Survey || — || align=right data-sort-value="0.72" | 720 m || 
|-id=112 bgcolor=#fefefe
| 361112 ||  || — || March 2, 2006 || Kitt Peak || Spacewatch || — || align=right data-sort-value="0.77" | 770 m || 
|-id=113 bgcolor=#fefefe
| 361113 ||  || — || January 5, 2006 || Mount Lemmon || Mount Lemmon Survey || — || align=right data-sort-value="0.75" | 750 m || 
|-id=114 bgcolor=#fefefe
| 361114 ||  || — || March 2, 2006 || Kitt Peak || Spacewatch || V || align=right data-sort-value="0.65" | 650 m || 
|-id=115 bgcolor=#fefefe
| 361115 ||  || — || March 3, 2006 || Kitt Peak || Spacewatch || FLO || align=right data-sort-value="0.56" | 560 m || 
|-id=116 bgcolor=#fefefe
| 361116 ||  || — || March 4, 2006 || Kitt Peak || Spacewatch || — || align=right data-sort-value="0.91" | 910 m || 
|-id=117 bgcolor=#fefefe
| 361117 ||  || — || March 23, 2006 || Kitt Peak || Spacewatch || V || align=right data-sort-value="0.67" | 670 m || 
|-id=118 bgcolor=#fefefe
| 361118 ||  || — || March 23, 2006 || Kitt Peak || Spacewatch || NYS || align=right data-sort-value="0.56" | 560 m || 
|-id=119 bgcolor=#fefefe
| 361119 ||  || — || March 24, 2006 || Mount Lemmon || Mount Lemmon Survey || V || align=right data-sort-value="0.52" | 520 m || 
|-id=120 bgcolor=#fefefe
| 361120 ||  || — || March 26, 2006 || Mount Lemmon || Mount Lemmon Survey || ERI || align=right | 1.7 km || 
|-id=121 bgcolor=#fefefe
| 361121 ||  || — || March 23, 2006 || Catalina || CSS || FLO || align=right data-sort-value="0.75" | 750 m || 
|-id=122 bgcolor=#fefefe
| 361122 ||  || — || April 2, 2006 || Piszkéstető || K. Sárneczky || FLO || align=right data-sort-value="0.62" | 620 m || 
|-id=123 bgcolor=#FFC2E0
| 361123 ||  || — || April 8, 2006 || Anderson Mesa || LONEOS || AMO || align=right data-sort-value="0.31" | 310 m || 
|-id=124 bgcolor=#fefefe
| 361124 ||  || — || April 2, 2006 || Kitt Peak || Spacewatch || FLO || align=right data-sort-value="0.61" | 610 m || 
|-id=125 bgcolor=#fefefe
| 361125 ||  || — || April 2, 2006 || Kitt Peak || Spacewatch || FLO || align=right data-sort-value="0.82" | 820 m || 
|-id=126 bgcolor=#fefefe
| 361126 ||  || — || April 2, 2006 || Kitt Peak || Spacewatch || FLO || align=right data-sort-value="0.76" | 760 m || 
|-id=127 bgcolor=#fefefe
| 361127 ||  || — || April 2, 2006 || Kitt Peak || Spacewatch || V || align=right data-sort-value="0.82" | 820 m || 
|-id=128 bgcolor=#fefefe
| 361128 ||  || — || December 3, 2005 || Mauna Kea || A. Boattini || — || align=right data-sort-value="0.72" | 720 m || 
|-id=129 bgcolor=#fefefe
| 361129 ||  || — || April 2, 2006 || Mount Lemmon || Mount Lemmon Survey || NYS || align=right data-sort-value="0.63" | 630 m || 
|-id=130 bgcolor=#fefefe
| 361130 ||  || — || April 2, 2006 || Kitt Peak || Spacewatch || FLO || align=right data-sort-value="0.63" | 630 m || 
|-id=131 bgcolor=#fefefe
| 361131 ||  || — || April 2, 2006 || Kitt Peak || Spacewatch || CHL || align=right | 1.7 km || 
|-id=132 bgcolor=#fefefe
| 361132 ||  || — || April 2, 2006 || Kitt Peak || Spacewatch || FLO || align=right data-sort-value="0.73" | 730 m || 
|-id=133 bgcolor=#fefefe
| 361133 ||  || — || April 8, 2006 || Mount Lemmon || Mount Lemmon Survey || — || align=right data-sort-value="0.84" | 840 m || 
|-id=134 bgcolor=#fefefe
| 361134 ||  || — || April 7, 2006 || Mount Lemmon || Mount Lemmon Survey || V || align=right data-sort-value="0.65" | 650 m || 
|-id=135 bgcolor=#fefefe
| 361135 ||  || — || April 19, 2006 || Anderson Mesa || LONEOS || — || align=right data-sort-value="0.89" | 890 m || 
|-id=136 bgcolor=#fefefe
| 361136 ||  || — || April 21, 2006 || Catalina || CSS || V || align=right data-sort-value="0.73" | 730 m || 
|-id=137 bgcolor=#fefefe
| 361137 ||  || — || April 24, 2006 || Mount Lemmon || Mount Lemmon Survey || — || align=right data-sort-value="0.82" | 820 m || 
|-id=138 bgcolor=#fefefe
| 361138 ||  || — || April 24, 2006 || Mount Lemmon || Mount Lemmon Survey || — || align=right | 1.1 km || 
|-id=139 bgcolor=#fefefe
| 361139 ||  || — || April 29, 2006 || Wrightwood || J. W. Young || MAS || align=right data-sort-value="0.61" | 610 m || 
|-id=140 bgcolor=#fefefe
| 361140 ||  || — || April 24, 2006 || Kitt Peak || Spacewatch || — || align=right data-sort-value="0.73" | 730 m || 
|-id=141 bgcolor=#fefefe
| 361141 ||  || — || April 24, 2006 || Kitt Peak || Spacewatch || — || align=right data-sort-value="0.87" | 870 m || 
|-id=142 bgcolor=#fefefe
| 361142 ||  || — || April 26, 2006 || Kitt Peak || Spacewatch || — || align=right data-sort-value="0.85" | 850 m || 
|-id=143 bgcolor=#fefefe
| 361143 ||  || — || April 26, 2006 || Kitt Peak || Spacewatch || MAS || align=right data-sort-value="0.63" | 630 m || 
|-id=144 bgcolor=#fefefe
| 361144 ||  || — || April 26, 2006 || Kitt Peak || Spacewatch || — || align=right data-sort-value="0.69" | 690 m || 
|-id=145 bgcolor=#fefefe
| 361145 ||  || — || April 26, 2006 || Kitt Peak || Spacewatch || — || align=right data-sort-value="0.76" | 760 m || 
|-id=146 bgcolor=#fefefe
| 361146 ||  || — || April 26, 2006 || Kitt Peak || Spacewatch || — || align=right data-sort-value="0.90" | 900 m || 
|-id=147 bgcolor=#fefefe
| 361147 ||  || — || April 30, 2006 || Kitt Peak || Spacewatch || — || align=right data-sort-value="0.68" | 680 m || 
|-id=148 bgcolor=#fefefe
| 361148 ||  || — || April 30, 2006 || Kitt Peak || Spacewatch || MAS || align=right data-sort-value="0.76" | 760 m || 
|-id=149 bgcolor=#fefefe
| 361149 ||  || — || April 30, 2006 || Kitt Peak || Spacewatch || MAS || align=right data-sort-value="0.57" | 570 m || 
|-id=150 bgcolor=#fefefe
| 361150 ||  || — || April 25, 2006 || Catalina || CSS || PHO || align=right | 1.3 km || 
|-id=151 bgcolor=#fefefe
| 361151 ||  || — || April 30, 2006 || Catalina || CSS || FLO || align=right data-sort-value="0.72" | 720 m || 
|-id=152 bgcolor=#fefefe
| 361152 ||  || — || April 19, 2006 || Catalina || CSS || NYS || align=right data-sort-value="0.60" | 600 m || 
|-id=153 bgcolor=#fefefe
| 361153 ||  || — || April 24, 2006 || Piszkéstető || K. Sárneczky || FLO || align=right data-sort-value="0.57" | 570 m || 
|-id=154 bgcolor=#fefefe
| 361154 ||  || — || May 1, 2006 || Socorro || LINEAR || — || align=right | 1.0 km || 
|-id=155 bgcolor=#fefefe
| 361155 ||  || — || April 19, 2006 || Kitt Peak || Spacewatch || — || align=right | 1.1 km || 
|-id=156 bgcolor=#fefefe
| 361156 ||  || — || May 3, 2006 || Kitt Peak || Spacewatch || — || align=right data-sort-value="0.74" | 740 m || 
|-id=157 bgcolor=#fefefe
| 361157 ||  || — || May 6, 2006 || Kitt Peak || Spacewatch || — || align=right | 1.2 km || 
|-id=158 bgcolor=#fefefe
| 361158 ||  || — || May 1, 2006 || Kitt Peak || Spacewatch || — || align=right | 1.4 km || 
|-id=159 bgcolor=#fefefe
| 361159 ||  || — || May 6, 2006 || Kitt Peak || Spacewatch || — || align=right | 2.0 km || 
|-id=160 bgcolor=#fefefe
| 361160 ||  || — || May 1, 2006 || Kitt Peak || M. W. Buie || — || align=right data-sort-value="0.87" | 870 m || 
|-id=161 bgcolor=#fefefe
| 361161 ||  || — || May 19, 2006 || Mount Lemmon || Mount Lemmon Survey || — || align=right data-sort-value="0.98" | 980 m || 
|-id=162 bgcolor=#fefefe
| 361162 ||  || — || May 19, 2006 || Mount Lemmon || Mount Lemmon Survey || — || align=right data-sort-value="0.93" | 930 m || 
|-id=163 bgcolor=#fefefe
| 361163 ||  || — || May 19, 2006 || Mount Lemmon || Mount Lemmon Survey || — || align=right data-sort-value="0.85" | 850 m || 
|-id=164 bgcolor=#fefefe
| 361164 ||  || — || May 23, 2006 || Reedy Creek || J. Broughton || — || align=right data-sort-value="0.66" | 660 m || 
|-id=165 bgcolor=#fefefe
| 361165 ||  || — || May 19, 2006 || Mount Lemmon || Mount Lemmon Survey || V || align=right data-sort-value="0.66" | 660 m || 
|-id=166 bgcolor=#fefefe
| 361166 ||  || — || May 23, 2006 || Mount Lemmon || Mount Lemmon Survey || NYS || align=right | 1.6 km || 
|-id=167 bgcolor=#fefefe
| 361167 ||  || — || May 23, 2006 || Mount Lemmon || Mount Lemmon Survey || NYS || align=right data-sort-value="0.64" | 640 m || 
|-id=168 bgcolor=#fefefe
| 361168 ||  || — || May 25, 2006 || Mount Lemmon || Mount Lemmon Survey || V || align=right data-sort-value="0.70" | 700 m || 
|-id=169 bgcolor=#fefefe
| 361169 ||  || — || May 20, 2006 || Anderson Mesa || LONEOS || NYS || align=right data-sort-value="0.74" | 740 m || 
|-id=170 bgcolor=#fefefe
| 361170 ||  || — || May 25, 2006 || Kitt Peak || Spacewatch || V || align=right data-sort-value="0.68" | 680 m || 
|-id=171 bgcolor=#fefefe
| 361171 ||  || — || May 31, 2006 || Mount Lemmon || Mount Lemmon Survey || V || align=right data-sort-value="0.71" | 710 m || 
|-id=172 bgcolor=#fefefe
| 361172 ||  || — || May 31, 2006 || Mount Lemmon || Mount Lemmon Survey || — || align=right | 1.0 km || 
|-id=173 bgcolor=#fefefe
| 361173 ||  || — || June 3, 2006 || Mount Lemmon || Mount Lemmon Survey || NYS || align=right | 1.4 km || 
|-id=174 bgcolor=#fefefe
| 361174 ||  || — || July 20, 2006 || Palomar || NEAT || NYS || align=right data-sort-value="0.74" | 740 m || 
|-id=175 bgcolor=#E9E9E9
| 361175 ||  || — || July 20, 2006 || Siding Spring || SSS || MAR || align=right | 1.4 km || 
|-id=176 bgcolor=#fefefe
| 361176 ||  || — || November 5, 1999 || Kitt Peak || Spacewatch || MAS || align=right data-sort-value="0.92" | 920 m || 
|-id=177 bgcolor=#fefefe
| 361177 ||  || — || August 15, 2006 || Palomar || NEAT || — || align=right | 1.2 km || 
|-id=178 bgcolor=#fefefe
| 361178 ||  || — || August 12, 2006 || Palomar || NEAT || — || align=right data-sort-value="0.97" | 970 m || 
|-id=179 bgcolor=#fefefe
| 361179 ||  || — || August 13, 2006 || Palomar || NEAT || MAS || align=right data-sort-value="0.80" | 800 m || 
|-id=180 bgcolor=#E9E9E9
| 361180 ||  || — || August 17, 2006 || Palomar || NEAT || BAR || align=right | 1.7 km || 
|-id=181 bgcolor=#fefefe
| 361181 ||  || — || August 17, 2006 || Palomar || NEAT || NYS || align=right data-sort-value="0.84" | 840 m || 
|-id=182 bgcolor=#fefefe
| 361182 ||  || — || August 22, 2006 || Palomar || NEAT || — || align=right data-sort-value="0.97" | 970 m || 
|-id=183 bgcolor=#E9E9E9
| 361183 Tandon ||  ||  || August 24, 2006 || Pises || Pises Obs. || — || align=right | 2.3 km || 
|-id=184 bgcolor=#E9E9E9
| 361184 ||  || — || August 18, 2006 || Socorro || LINEAR || — || align=right | 2.4 km || 
|-id=185 bgcolor=#E9E9E9
| 361185 ||  || — || August 18, 2006 || Anderson Mesa || LONEOS || — || align=right | 1.5 km || 
|-id=186 bgcolor=#E9E9E9
| 361186 ||  || — || August 17, 2006 || Palomar || NEAT || — || align=right | 1.2 km || 
|-id=187 bgcolor=#E9E9E9
| 361187 ||  || — || August 21, 2006 || Kitt Peak || Spacewatch || — || align=right | 2.1 km || 
|-id=188 bgcolor=#E9E9E9
| 361188 ||  || — || August 27, 2006 || Kitt Peak || Spacewatch || RAF || align=right | 1.0 km || 
|-id=189 bgcolor=#E9E9E9
| 361189 ||  || — || August 23, 2006 || Palomar || NEAT || — || align=right | 1.9 km || 
|-id=190 bgcolor=#E9E9E9
| 361190 ||  || — || August 29, 2006 || Catalina || CSS || — || align=right | 2.1 km || 
|-id=191 bgcolor=#E9E9E9
| 361191 ||  || — || August 30, 2006 || Anderson Mesa || LONEOS || — || align=right | 1.4 km || 
|-id=192 bgcolor=#E9E9E9
| 361192 ||  || — || August 21, 2006 || Kitt Peak || Spacewatch || MAR || align=right | 1.3 km || 
|-id=193 bgcolor=#fefefe
| 361193 Cheungtaklung ||  ||  || August 29, 2006 || Lulin Observatory || Q.-z. Ye, H.-C. Lin || CHL || align=right | 1.9 km || 
|-id=194 bgcolor=#E9E9E9
| 361194 ||  || — || September 12, 2006 || Catalina || CSS || — || align=right | 2.5 km || 
|-id=195 bgcolor=#fefefe
| 361195 ||  || — || September 14, 2006 || Catalina || CSS || H || align=right data-sort-value="0.82" | 820 m || 
|-id=196 bgcolor=#E9E9E9
| 361196 ||  || — || September 14, 2006 || Palomar || NEAT || — || align=right | 2.8 km || 
|-id=197 bgcolor=#E9E9E9
| 361197 ||  || — || September 14, 2006 || Catalina || CSS || — || align=right | 3.0 km || 
|-id=198 bgcolor=#E9E9E9
| 361198 ||  || — || September 14, 2006 || Palomar || NEAT || BAR || align=right | 1.3 km || 
|-id=199 bgcolor=#E9E9E9
| 361199 ||  || — || September 13, 2006 || Palomar || NEAT || MAR || align=right | 1.0 km || 
|-id=200 bgcolor=#E9E9E9
| 361200 ||  || — || September 14, 2006 || Kitt Peak || Spacewatch || — || align=right | 1.8 km || 
|}

361201–361300 

|-bgcolor=#E9E9E9
| 361201 ||  || — || September 15, 2006 || Kitt Peak || Spacewatch || — || align=right | 2.0 km || 
|-id=202 bgcolor=#E9E9E9
| 361202 ||  || — || September 12, 2006 || Catalina || CSS || — || align=right | 2.0 km || 
|-id=203 bgcolor=#E9E9E9
| 361203 ||  || — || September 14, 2006 || Catalina || CSS || — || align=right | 1.9 km || 
|-id=204 bgcolor=#E9E9E9
| 361204 ||  || — || September 14, 2006 || Kitt Peak || Spacewatch || — || align=right | 1.5 km || 
|-id=205 bgcolor=#fefefe
| 361205 ||  || — || September 15, 2006 || Kitt Peak || Spacewatch || H || align=right data-sort-value="0.59" | 590 m || 
|-id=206 bgcolor=#E9E9E9
| 361206 ||  || — || September 15, 2006 || Kitt Peak || Spacewatch || — || align=right | 2.4 km || 
|-id=207 bgcolor=#E9E9E9
| 361207 ||  || — || September 15, 2006 || Kitt Peak || Spacewatch || — || align=right | 1.4 km || 
|-id=208 bgcolor=#E9E9E9
| 361208 ||  || — || September 15, 2006 || Kitt Peak || Spacewatch || — || align=right | 1.2 km || 
|-id=209 bgcolor=#E9E9E9
| 361209 ||  || — || September 15, 2006 || Kitt Peak || Spacewatch || — || align=right | 1.7 km || 
|-id=210 bgcolor=#E9E9E9
| 361210 ||  || — || September 15, 2006 || Kitt Peak || Spacewatch || — || align=right | 1.8 km || 
|-id=211 bgcolor=#E9E9E9
| 361211 ||  || — || September 15, 2006 || Kitt Peak || Spacewatch || HEN || align=right | 1.2 km || 
|-id=212 bgcolor=#E9E9E9
| 361212 ||  || — || September 16, 2006 || Kitt Peak || Spacewatch || — || align=right | 2.5 km || 
|-id=213 bgcolor=#fefefe
| 361213 ||  || — || September 16, 2006 || Catalina || CSS || H || align=right data-sort-value="0.85" | 850 m || 
|-id=214 bgcolor=#E9E9E9
| 361214 ||  || — || September 17, 2006 || Kitt Peak || Spacewatch || — || align=right | 2.7 km || 
|-id=215 bgcolor=#E9E9E9
| 361215 ||  || — || September 17, 2006 || Kitt Peak || Spacewatch || — || align=right | 2.1 km || 
|-id=216 bgcolor=#E9E9E9
| 361216 ||  || — || September 18, 2006 || Catalina || CSS || KRM || align=right | 4.3 km || 
|-id=217 bgcolor=#E9E9E9
| 361217 ||  || — || September 17, 2006 || Catalina || CSS || — || align=right | 1.2 km || 
|-id=218 bgcolor=#fefefe
| 361218 ||  || — || September 16, 2006 || Catalina || CSS || PHO || align=right | 1.1 km || 
|-id=219 bgcolor=#E9E9E9
| 361219 ||  || — || September 19, 2006 || Kitt Peak || Spacewatch || — || align=right | 2.2 km || 
|-id=220 bgcolor=#E9E9E9
| 361220 ||  || — || September 18, 2006 || Kitt Peak || Spacewatch || — || align=right | 1.5 km || 
|-id=221 bgcolor=#E9E9E9
| 361221 ||  || — || September 18, 2006 || Kitt Peak || Spacewatch || — || align=right data-sort-value="0.96" | 960 m || 
|-id=222 bgcolor=#E9E9E9
| 361222 ||  || — || September 18, 2006 || Kitt Peak || Spacewatch || — || align=right | 2.2 km || 
|-id=223 bgcolor=#E9E9E9
| 361223 ||  || — || September 18, 2006 || Kitt Peak || Spacewatch || — || align=right data-sort-value="0.88" | 880 m || 
|-id=224 bgcolor=#E9E9E9
| 361224 ||  || — || September 18, 2006 || Kitt Peak || Spacewatch || HEN || align=right data-sort-value="0.91" | 910 m || 
|-id=225 bgcolor=#E9E9E9
| 361225 ||  || — || September 19, 2006 || Kitt Peak || Spacewatch || — || align=right | 1.7 km || 
|-id=226 bgcolor=#E9E9E9
| 361226 ||  || — || September 19, 2006 || Anderson Mesa || LONEOS || — || align=right | 2.1 km || 
|-id=227 bgcolor=#E9E9E9
| 361227 ||  || — || September 23, 2006 || Kitt Peak || Spacewatch || — || align=right | 1.3 km || 
|-id=228 bgcolor=#E9E9E9
| 361228 ||  || — || September 19, 2006 || Catalina || CSS || HNS || align=right | 1.4 km || 
|-id=229 bgcolor=#fefefe
| 361229 ||  || — || September 22, 2006 || Catalina || CSS || H || align=right data-sort-value="0.85" | 850 m || 
|-id=230 bgcolor=#E9E9E9
| 361230 ||  || — || September 16, 2006 || Catalina || CSS || — || align=right | 2.8 km || 
|-id=231 bgcolor=#E9E9E9
| 361231 ||  || — || September 19, 2006 || Kitt Peak || Spacewatch || — || align=right | 2.3 km || 
|-id=232 bgcolor=#E9E9E9
| 361232 ||  || — || September 25, 2006 || Kitt Peak || Spacewatch || — || align=right | 1.4 km || 
|-id=233 bgcolor=#E9E9E9
| 361233 ||  || — || September 25, 2006 || Kitt Peak || Spacewatch || — || align=right data-sort-value="0.89" | 890 m || 
|-id=234 bgcolor=#E9E9E9
| 361234 ||  || — || September 25, 2006 || Kitt Peak || Spacewatch || — || align=right | 1.0 km || 
|-id=235 bgcolor=#E9E9E9
| 361235 ||  || — || September 25, 2006 || Kitt Peak || Spacewatch || ADE || align=right | 2.6 km || 
|-id=236 bgcolor=#E9E9E9
| 361236 ||  || — || September 25, 2006 || Kitt Peak || Spacewatch || — || align=right | 1.7 km || 
|-id=237 bgcolor=#E9E9E9
| 361237 ||  || — || September 26, 2006 || Mount Lemmon || Mount Lemmon Survey || JUN || align=right | 1.1 km || 
|-id=238 bgcolor=#E9E9E9
| 361238 ||  || — || September 25, 2006 || Kitt Peak || Spacewatch || — || align=right | 1.7 km || 
|-id=239 bgcolor=#E9E9E9
| 361239 ||  || — || September 26, 2006 || Kitt Peak || Spacewatch || — || align=right | 2.2 km || 
|-id=240 bgcolor=#E9E9E9
| 361240 ||  || — || September 25, 2006 || Kitt Peak || Spacewatch || NEM || align=right | 2.7 km || 
|-id=241 bgcolor=#E9E9E9
| 361241 ||  || — || September 18, 2006 || Catalina || CSS || — || align=right | 1.3 km || 
|-id=242 bgcolor=#E9E9E9
| 361242 ||  || — || September 26, 2006 || Kitt Peak || Spacewatch || — || align=right | 1.1 km || 
|-id=243 bgcolor=#E9E9E9
| 361243 ||  || — || September 26, 2006 || Kitt Peak || Spacewatch || — || align=right | 1.2 km || 
|-id=244 bgcolor=#E9E9E9
| 361244 ||  || — || September 26, 2006 || Kitt Peak || Spacewatch || — || align=right | 1.7 km || 
|-id=245 bgcolor=#E9E9E9
| 361245 ||  || — || September 26, 2006 || Kitt Peak || Spacewatch || HEN || align=right data-sort-value="0.87" | 870 m || 
|-id=246 bgcolor=#E9E9E9
| 361246 ||  || — || September 26, 2006 || Kitt Peak || Spacewatch || MAR || align=right data-sort-value="0.86" | 860 m || 
|-id=247 bgcolor=#E9E9E9
| 361247 ||  || — || September 26, 2006 || Mount Lemmon || Mount Lemmon Survey || — || align=right | 1.7 km || 
|-id=248 bgcolor=#d6d6d6
| 361248 ||  || — || September 26, 2006 || Kitt Peak || Spacewatch || LAU || align=right | 1.1 km || 
|-id=249 bgcolor=#E9E9E9
| 361249 ||  || — || September 26, 2006 || Kitt Peak || Spacewatch || — || align=right | 1.4 km || 
|-id=250 bgcolor=#E9E9E9
| 361250 ||  || — || September 27, 2006 || Mount Lemmon || Mount Lemmon Survey || HOF || align=right | 2.8 km || 
|-id=251 bgcolor=#d6d6d6
| 361251 ||  || — || September 27, 2006 || Mount Lemmon || Mount Lemmon Survey || BRA || align=right | 1.7 km || 
|-id=252 bgcolor=#E9E9E9
| 361252 ||  || — || September 28, 2006 || Kitt Peak || Spacewatch || HNS || align=right | 1.7 km || 
|-id=253 bgcolor=#E9E9E9
| 361253 ||  || — || September 26, 2006 || Mount Lemmon || Mount Lemmon Survey || — || align=right | 1.8 km || 
|-id=254 bgcolor=#E9E9E9
| 361254 ||  || — || September 27, 2006 || Kitt Peak || Spacewatch || — || align=right | 2.9 km || 
|-id=255 bgcolor=#E9E9E9
| 361255 ||  || — || September 27, 2006 || Kitt Peak || Spacewatch || MRX || align=right | 1.1 km || 
|-id=256 bgcolor=#E9E9E9
| 361256 ||  || — || September 27, 2006 || Kitt Peak || Spacewatch || NEM || align=right | 2.1 km || 
|-id=257 bgcolor=#E9E9E9
| 361257 ||  || — || September 27, 2006 || Kitt Peak || Spacewatch || HNS || align=right | 1.3 km || 
|-id=258 bgcolor=#E9E9E9
| 361258 ||  || — || September 27, 2006 || Kitt Peak || Spacewatch || — || align=right | 1.4 km || 
|-id=259 bgcolor=#E9E9E9
| 361259 ||  || — || September 28, 2006 || Kitt Peak || Spacewatch || — || align=right | 1.5 km || 
|-id=260 bgcolor=#E9E9E9
| 361260 ||  || — || September 28, 2006 || Kitt Peak || Spacewatch || — || align=right data-sort-value="0.96" | 960 m || 
|-id=261 bgcolor=#E9E9E9
| 361261 ||  || — || September 30, 2006 || Catalina || CSS || — || align=right | 1.9 km || 
|-id=262 bgcolor=#E9E9E9
| 361262 ||  || — || September 30, 2006 || Catalina || CSS || — || align=right | 1.9 km || 
|-id=263 bgcolor=#E9E9E9
| 361263 ||  || — || September 30, 2006 || Catalina || CSS || — || align=right | 2.4 km || 
|-id=264 bgcolor=#E9E9E9
| 361264 ||  || — || September 18, 2006 || La Sagra || OAM Obs. || — || align=right | 1.6 km || 
|-id=265 bgcolor=#E9E9E9
| 361265 ||  || — || September 23, 2006 || Moletai || K. Černis, J. Zdanavičius || — || align=right | 1.9 km || 
|-id=266 bgcolor=#d6d6d6
| 361266 ||  || — || September 17, 2006 || Apache Point || A. C. Becker || — || align=right | 3.1 km || 
|-id=267 bgcolor=#E9E9E9
| 361267 ʻIʻiwi ||  ||  || September 17, 2006 || Mauna Kea || J. Masiero || — || align=right | 1.8 km || 
|-id=268 bgcolor=#E9E9E9
| 361268 ||  || — || September 17, 2006 || Kitt Peak || Spacewatch || NEM || align=right | 2.3 km || 
|-id=269 bgcolor=#E9E9E9
| 361269 ||  || — || September 18, 2006 || Catalina || CSS || — || align=right | 1.7 km || 
|-id=270 bgcolor=#E9E9E9
| 361270 ||  || — || September 30, 2006 || Mount Lemmon || Mount Lemmon Survey || — || align=right | 1.4 km || 
|-id=271 bgcolor=#E9E9E9
| 361271 ||  || — || September 17, 2006 || Kitt Peak || Spacewatch || — || align=right | 1.5 km || 
|-id=272 bgcolor=#E9E9E9
| 361272 ||  || — || September 18, 2006 || Catalina || CSS || — || align=right | 2.1 km || 
|-id=273 bgcolor=#E9E9E9
| 361273 ||  || — || September 25, 2006 || Mount Lemmon || Mount Lemmon Survey || — || align=right | 2.3 km || 
|-id=274 bgcolor=#E9E9E9
| 361274 ||  || — || September 18, 2006 || Catalina || CSS || — || align=right | 2.5 km || 
|-id=275 bgcolor=#E9E9E9
| 361275 ||  || — || October 2, 2006 || Mount Lemmon || Mount Lemmon Survey || — || align=right | 2.2 km || 
|-id=276 bgcolor=#E9E9E9
| 361276 ||  || — || October 3, 2006 || Kitt Peak || Spacewatch || GEF || align=right | 1.3 km || 
|-id=277 bgcolor=#E9E9E9
| 361277 ||  || — || September 28, 2006 || Catalina || CSS || EUN || align=right | 1.7 km || 
|-id=278 bgcolor=#E9E9E9
| 361278 ||  || — || October 11, 2006 || Kitt Peak || Spacewatch || — || align=right | 1.9 km || 
|-id=279 bgcolor=#E9E9E9
| 361279 ||  || — || October 11, 2006 || Kitt Peak || Spacewatch || BRG || align=right | 2.1 km || 
|-id=280 bgcolor=#E9E9E9
| 361280 ||  || — || October 11, 2006 || Kitt Peak || Spacewatch || HEN || align=right | 1.3 km || 
|-id=281 bgcolor=#E9E9E9
| 361281 ||  || — || October 12, 2006 || Kitt Peak || Spacewatch || AST || align=right | 1.8 km || 
|-id=282 bgcolor=#E9E9E9
| 361282 ||  || — || October 12, 2006 || Kitt Peak || Spacewatch || — || align=right | 2.2 km || 
|-id=283 bgcolor=#E9E9E9
| 361283 ||  || — || October 12, 2006 || Kitt Peak || Spacewatch || — || align=right | 2.2 km || 
|-id=284 bgcolor=#E9E9E9
| 361284 ||  || — || October 12, 2006 || Kitt Peak || Spacewatch || WIT || align=right | 1.2 km || 
|-id=285 bgcolor=#E9E9E9
| 361285 ||  || — || October 12, 2006 || Kitt Peak || Spacewatch || — || align=right | 2.2 km || 
|-id=286 bgcolor=#E9E9E9
| 361286 ||  || — || October 12, 2006 || Kitt Peak || Spacewatch || — || align=right | 1.9 km || 
|-id=287 bgcolor=#E9E9E9
| 361287 ||  || — || October 12, 2006 || Kitt Peak || Spacewatch || — || align=right | 2.8 km || 
|-id=288 bgcolor=#E9E9E9
| 361288 ||  || — || October 12, 2006 || Kitt Peak || Spacewatch || — || align=right | 2.2 km || 
|-id=289 bgcolor=#E9E9E9
| 361289 ||  || — || October 12, 2006 || Kitt Peak || Spacewatch || — || align=right data-sort-value="0.98" | 980 m || 
|-id=290 bgcolor=#E9E9E9
| 361290 ||  || — || October 12, 2006 || Kitt Peak || Spacewatch || AST || align=right | 1.8 km || 
|-id=291 bgcolor=#E9E9E9
| 361291 ||  || — || October 12, 2006 || Kitt Peak || Spacewatch || — || align=right | 2.1 km || 
|-id=292 bgcolor=#E9E9E9
| 361292 ||  || — || October 12, 2006 || Palomar || NEAT || — || align=right | 1.8 km || 
|-id=293 bgcolor=#E9E9E9
| 361293 ||  || — || October 12, 2006 || Kitt Peak || Spacewatch || AST || align=right | 2.0 km || 
|-id=294 bgcolor=#fefefe
| 361294 ||  || — || October 12, 2006 || Palomar || NEAT || H || align=right data-sort-value="0.74" | 740 m || 
|-id=295 bgcolor=#E9E9E9
| 361295 ||  || — || October 15, 2006 || Catalina || CSS || — || align=right | 2.1 km || 
|-id=296 bgcolor=#E9E9E9
| 361296 ||  || — || October 13, 2006 || Kitt Peak || Spacewatch || NEM || align=right | 2.3 km || 
|-id=297 bgcolor=#E9E9E9
| 361297 ||  || — || October 10, 2006 || Palomar || NEAT || — || align=right | 1.4 km || 
|-id=298 bgcolor=#E9E9E9
| 361298 ||  || — || October 12, 2006 || Kitt Peak || Spacewatch || — || align=right | 2.1 km || 
|-id=299 bgcolor=#E9E9E9
| 361299 ||  || — || October 13, 2006 || Kitt Peak || Spacewatch || — || align=right | 2.4 km || 
|-id=300 bgcolor=#E9E9E9
| 361300 ||  || — || October 13, 2006 || Kitt Peak || Spacewatch || HNS || align=right | 2.0 km || 
|}

361301–361400 

|-bgcolor=#E9E9E9
| 361301 ||  || — || October 13, 2006 || Kitt Peak || Spacewatch || — || align=right | 1.7 km || 
|-id=302 bgcolor=#E9E9E9
| 361302 ||  || — || October 15, 2006 || Kitt Peak || Spacewatch || — || align=right | 1.9 km || 
|-id=303 bgcolor=#E9E9E9
| 361303 ||  || — || October 15, 2006 || Kitt Peak || Spacewatch || — || align=right | 2.0 km || 
|-id=304 bgcolor=#fefefe
| 361304 ||  || — || October 12, 2006 || Siding Spring || SSS || H || align=right | 1.0 km || 
|-id=305 bgcolor=#E9E9E9
| 361305 ||  || — || October 12, 2006 || Apache Point || A. C. Becker || — || align=right | 1.8 km || 
|-id=306 bgcolor=#E9E9E9
| 361306 ||  || — || October 4, 2006 || Mount Lemmon || Mount Lemmon Survey || AER || align=right | 2.4 km || 
|-id=307 bgcolor=#E9E9E9
| 361307 ||  || — || October 2, 2006 || Mount Lemmon || Mount Lemmon Survey || — || align=right | 1.1 km || 
|-id=308 bgcolor=#fefefe
| 361308 || 2006 UV || — || October 16, 2006 || Altschwendt || W. Ries || V || align=right data-sort-value="0.67" | 670 m || 
|-id=309 bgcolor=#E9E9E9
| 361309 ||  || — || October 16, 2006 || Kitt Peak || Spacewatch || WIT || align=right | 1.1 km || 
|-id=310 bgcolor=#E9E9E9
| 361310 ||  || — || October 16, 2006 || Catalina || CSS || HNS || align=right | 1.6 km || 
|-id=311 bgcolor=#E9E9E9
| 361311 ||  || — || October 16, 2006 || Catalina || CSS || — || align=right | 2.3 km || 
|-id=312 bgcolor=#E9E9E9
| 361312 ||  || — || October 17, 2006 || Kitt Peak || Spacewatch || — || align=right | 2.0 km || 
|-id=313 bgcolor=#fefefe
| 361313 ||  || — || October 16, 2006 || Catalina || CSS || H || align=right data-sort-value="0.75" | 750 m || 
|-id=314 bgcolor=#E9E9E9
| 361314 ||  || — || October 16, 2006 || Kitt Peak || Spacewatch || WIT || align=right data-sort-value="0.97" | 970 m || 
|-id=315 bgcolor=#E9E9E9
| 361315 ||  || — || October 16, 2006 || Kitt Peak || Spacewatch || — || align=right | 1.5 km || 
|-id=316 bgcolor=#E9E9E9
| 361316 ||  || — || October 16, 2006 || Kitt Peak || Spacewatch || — || align=right | 2.2 km || 
|-id=317 bgcolor=#E9E9E9
| 361317 ||  || — || October 16, 2006 || Kitt Peak || Spacewatch || — || align=right | 1.8 km || 
|-id=318 bgcolor=#E9E9E9
| 361318 ||  || — || September 27, 2006 || Mount Lemmon || Mount Lemmon Survey || — || align=right | 2.5 km || 
|-id=319 bgcolor=#E9E9E9
| 361319 ||  || — || October 16, 2006 || Kitt Peak || Spacewatch || PAD || align=right | 1.5 km || 
|-id=320 bgcolor=#fefefe
| 361320 ||  || — || September 30, 2006 || Catalina || CSS || H || align=right | 1.0 km || 
|-id=321 bgcolor=#E9E9E9
| 361321 ||  || — || October 16, 2006 || Kitt Peak || Spacewatch || WIT || align=right | 1.0 km || 
|-id=322 bgcolor=#E9E9E9
| 361322 ||  || — || October 16, 2006 || Kitt Peak || Spacewatch || HEN || align=right | 1.3 km || 
|-id=323 bgcolor=#E9E9E9
| 361323 ||  || — || October 16, 2006 || Kitt Peak || Spacewatch || HOF || align=right | 2.6 km || 
|-id=324 bgcolor=#E9E9E9
| 361324 ||  || — || October 16, 2006 || Kitt Peak || Spacewatch || — || align=right | 2.3 km || 
|-id=325 bgcolor=#E9E9E9
| 361325 ||  || — || October 17, 2006 || Kitt Peak || Spacewatch || WIT || align=right data-sort-value="0.92" | 920 m || 
|-id=326 bgcolor=#E9E9E9
| 361326 ||  || — || October 17, 2006 || Mount Lemmon || Mount Lemmon Survey || — || align=right data-sort-value="0.94" | 940 m || 
|-id=327 bgcolor=#E9E9E9
| 361327 ||  || — || October 18, 2006 || Kitt Peak || Spacewatch || — || align=right | 2.7 km || 
|-id=328 bgcolor=#E9E9E9
| 361328 ||  || — || October 19, 2006 || Kitt Peak || Spacewatch || HEN || align=right data-sort-value="0.92" | 920 m || 
|-id=329 bgcolor=#fefefe
| 361329 ||  || — || October 17, 2006 || Andrushivka || Andrushivka Obs. || — || align=right | 1.3 km || 
|-id=330 bgcolor=#E9E9E9
| 361330 ||  || — || October 16, 2006 || Kitt Peak || Spacewatch || WIT || align=right | 1.0 km || 
|-id=331 bgcolor=#E9E9E9
| 361331 ||  || — || September 17, 2006 || Kitt Peak || Spacewatch || — || align=right | 1.4 km || 
|-id=332 bgcolor=#E9E9E9
| 361332 ||  || — || October 17, 2006 || Kitt Peak || Spacewatch || HNS || align=right | 1.1 km || 
|-id=333 bgcolor=#E9E9E9
| 361333 ||  || — || October 17, 2006 || Kitt Peak || Spacewatch || ADE || align=right | 2.1 km || 
|-id=334 bgcolor=#E9E9E9
| 361334 ||  || — || October 17, 2006 || Kitt Peak || Spacewatch || — || align=right | 1.1 km || 
|-id=335 bgcolor=#E9E9E9
| 361335 ||  || — || October 17, 2006 || Kitt Peak || Spacewatch || MRX || align=right | 1.2 km || 
|-id=336 bgcolor=#E9E9E9
| 361336 ||  || — || October 18, 2006 || Kitt Peak || Spacewatch || — || align=right | 2.1 km || 
|-id=337 bgcolor=#E9E9E9
| 361337 ||  || — || October 2, 2006 || Mount Lemmon || Mount Lemmon Survey || HEN || align=right data-sort-value="0.95" | 950 m || 
|-id=338 bgcolor=#E9E9E9
| 361338 ||  || — || October 18, 2006 || Kitt Peak || Spacewatch || HEN || align=right | 1.2 km || 
|-id=339 bgcolor=#E9E9E9
| 361339 ||  || — || October 18, 2006 || Kitt Peak || Spacewatch || — || align=right | 1.9 km || 
|-id=340 bgcolor=#E9E9E9
| 361340 ||  || — || October 19, 2006 || Kitt Peak || Spacewatch || PAD || align=right | 1.7 km || 
|-id=341 bgcolor=#E9E9E9
| 361341 ||  || — || October 19, 2006 || Kitt Peak || Spacewatch || NEM || align=right | 2.3 km || 
|-id=342 bgcolor=#E9E9E9
| 361342 ||  || — || October 19, 2006 || Kitt Peak || Spacewatch || HNS || align=right | 1.7 km || 
|-id=343 bgcolor=#E9E9E9
| 361343 ||  || — || October 19, 2006 || Kitt Peak || Spacewatch || — || align=right | 3.2 km || 
|-id=344 bgcolor=#E9E9E9
| 361344 ||  || — || October 19, 2006 || Kitt Peak || Spacewatch || — || align=right | 2.3 km || 
|-id=345 bgcolor=#E9E9E9
| 361345 ||  || — || October 19, 2006 || Kitt Peak || Spacewatch || — || align=right | 2.3 km || 
|-id=346 bgcolor=#E9E9E9
| 361346 ||  || — || October 21, 2006 || Mount Lemmon || Mount Lemmon Survey || — || align=right | 2.8 km || 
|-id=347 bgcolor=#E9E9E9
| 361347 ||  || — || September 19, 2006 || Kitt Peak || Spacewatch || WIT || align=right data-sort-value="0.90" | 900 m || 
|-id=348 bgcolor=#E9E9E9
| 361348 ||  || — || October 21, 2006 || Mount Lemmon || Mount Lemmon Survey || WIT || align=right | 1.1 km || 
|-id=349 bgcolor=#E9E9E9
| 361349 ||  || — || October 24, 2006 || Kitami || K. Endate || — || align=right | 2.2 km || 
|-id=350 bgcolor=#E9E9E9
| 361350 ||  || — || October 19, 2006 || Catalina || CSS || — || align=right | 1.1 km || 
|-id=351 bgcolor=#E9E9E9
| 361351 ||  || — || October 20, 2006 || Kitt Peak || Spacewatch || — || align=right | 1.6 km || 
|-id=352 bgcolor=#E9E9E9
| 361352 ||  || — || October 21, 2006 || Kitt Peak || Spacewatch || WIT || align=right | 1.3 km || 
|-id=353 bgcolor=#E9E9E9
| 361353 ||  || — || October 22, 2006 || Palomar || NEAT || — || align=right | 3.3 km || 
|-id=354 bgcolor=#d6d6d6
| 361354 ||  || — || October 23, 2006 || Kitt Peak || Spacewatch || — || align=right | 2.2 km || 
|-id=355 bgcolor=#E9E9E9
| 361355 ||  || — || October 23, 2006 || Kitt Peak || Spacewatch || HOF || align=right | 2.5 km || 
|-id=356 bgcolor=#E9E9E9
| 361356 ||  || — || October 21, 2006 || Mount Lemmon || Mount Lemmon Survey || — || align=right data-sort-value="0.94" | 940 m || 
|-id=357 bgcolor=#E9E9E9
| 361357 ||  || — || October 30, 2006 || Nyukasa || Mount Nyukasa Stn. || — || align=right | 1.6 km || 
|-id=358 bgcolor=#E9E9E9
| 361358 ||  || — || October 16, 2006 || Catalina || CSS || — || align=right | 2.1 km || 
|-id=359 bgcolor=#E9E9E9
| 361359 ||  || — || October 19, 2006 || Palomar || NEAT || — || align=right | 1.8 km || 
|-id=360 bgcolor=#E9E9E9
| 361360 ||  || — || October 20, 2006 || Palomar || NEAT || — || align=right | 2.0 km || 
|-id=361 bgcolor=#E9E9E9
| 361361 ||  || — || October 23, 2006 || Kitt Peak || Spacewatch || WIT || align=right data-sort-value="0.95" | 950 m || 
|-id=362 bgcolor=#E9E9E9
| 361362 ||  || — || October 20, 2006 || Kitt Peak || Spacewatch || — || align=right | 1.6 km || 
|-id=363 bgcolor=#E9E9E9
| 361363 ||  || — || October 28, 2006 || Mount Lemmon || Mount Lemmon Survey || — || align=right | 2.2 km || 
|-id=364 bgcolor=#E9E9E9
| 361364 ||  || — || October 28, 2006 || Mount Lemmon || Mount Lemmon Survey || — || align=right | 2.4 km || 
|-id=365 bgcolor=#E9E9E9
| 361365 ||  || — || October 27, 2006 || Kitt Peak || Spacewatch || HEN || align=right | 1.0 km || 
|-id=366 bgcolor=#E9E9E9
| 361366 ||  || — || October 27, 2006 || Kitt Peak || Spacewatch || — || align=right | 1.6 km || 
|-id=367 bgcolor=#E9E9E9
| 361367 ||  || — || October 27, 2006 || Kitt Peak || Spacewatch || — || align=right | 3.0 km || 
|-id=368 bgcolor=#E9E9E9
| 361368 ||  || — || October 28, 2006 || Kitt Peak || Spacewatch || NEM || align=right | 2.0 km || 
|-id=369 bgcolor=#E9E9E9
| 361369 ||  || — || September 26, 2006 || Mount Lemmon || Mount Lemmon Survey || MAR || align=right | 1.3 km || 
|-id=370 bgcolor=#E9E9E9
| 361370 ||  || — || October 28, 2006 || Mount Lemmon || Mount Lemmon Survey || — || align=right | 2.7 km || 
|-id=371 bgcolor=#E9E9E9
| 361371 ||  || — || October 19, 2006 || Kitt Peak || M. W. Buie || — || align=right | 1.4 km || 
|-id=372 bgcolor=#E9E9E9
| 361372 ||  || — || October 19, 2006 || Kitt Peak || M. W. Buie || — || align=right | 2.2 km || 
|-id=373 bgcolor=#d6d6d6
| 361373 ||  || — || October 21, 2006 || Apache Point || A. C. Becker || — || align=right | 2.8 km || 
|-id=374 bgcolor=#E9E9E9
| 361374 ||  || — || October 31, 2006 || Mount Lemmon || Mount Lemmon Survey || — || align=right | 1.3 km || 
|-id=375 bgcolor=#E9E9E9
| 361375 ||  || — || November 9, 2006 || Kitt Peak || Spacewatch || — || align=right | 1.9 km || 
|-id=376 bgcolor=#E9E9E9
| 361376 ||  || — || November 9, 2006 || Kitt Peak || Spacewatch || — || align=right | 2.1 km || 
|-id=377 bgcolor=#E9E9E9
| 361377 ||  || — || October 19, 2006 || Mount Lemmon || Mount Lemmon Survey || — || align=right | 2.0 km || 
|-id=378 bgcolor=#E9E9E9
| 361378 ||  || — || November 10, 2006 || Kitt Peak || Spacewatch || HOF || align=right | 2.8 km || 
|-id=379 bgcolor=#E9E9E9
| 361379 ||  || — || November 12, 2006 || Mount Lemmon || Mount Lemmon Survey || HEN || align=right data-sort-value="0.83" | 830 m || 
|-id=380 bgcolor=#E9E9E9
| 361380 ||  || — || November 12, 2006 || Mount Lemmon || Mount Lemmon Survey || — || align=right | 1.6 km || 
|-id=381 bgcolor=#d6d6d6
| 361381 ||  || — || November 10, 2006 || Kitt Peak || Spacewatch || — || align=right | 2.5 km || 
|-id=382 bgcolor=#E9E9E9
| 361382 ||  || — || November 10, 2006 || Kitt Peak || Spacewatch || — || align=right | 3.2 km || 
|-id=383 bgcolor=#E9E9E9
| 361383 ||  || — || November 11, 2006 || Kitt Peak || Spacewatch || — || align=right | 2.0 km || 
|-id=384 bgcolor=#E9E9E9
| 361384 ||  || — || November 11, 2006 || Kitt Peak || Spacewatch || AST || align=right | 2.0 km || 
|-id=385 bgcolor=#E9E9E9
| 361385 ||  || — || November 11, 2006 || Kitt Peak || Spacewatch || — || align=right | 2.5 km || 
|-id=386 bgcolor=#d6d6d6
| 361386 ||  || — || November 11, 2006 || Kitt Peak || Spacewatch || — || align=right | 1.9 km || 
|-id=387 bgcolor=#E9E9E9
| 361387 ||  || — || October 28, 2006 || Mount Lemmon || Mount Lemmon Survey || AGN || align=right | 1.4 km || 
|-id=388 bgcolor=#E9E9E9
| 361388 ||  || — || November 13, 2006 || Catalina || CSS || — || align=right | 3.1 km || 
|-id=389 bgcolor=#E9E9E9
| 361389 ||  || — || November 15, 2006 || Mount Lemmon || Mount Lemmon Survey || GEF || align=right | 1.4 km || 
|-id=390 bgcolor=#E9E9E9
| 361390 ||  || — || November 13, 2006 || Kitt Peak || Spacewatch || AER || align=right | 1.3 km || 
|-id=391 bgcolor=#E9E9E9
| 361391 ||  || — || November 13, 2006 || Kitt Peak || Spacewatch || — || align=right | 2.3 km || 
|-id=392 bgcolor=#E9E9E9
| 361392 ||  || — || November 14, 2006 || Mount Lemmon || Mount Lemmon Survey || — || align=right | 2.1 km || 
|-id=393 bgcolor=#E9E9E9
| 361393 ||  || — || November 14, 2006 || Mount Lemmon || Mount Lemmon Survey || NEM || align=right | 2.3 km || 
|-id=394 bgcolor=#E9E9E9
| 361394 ||  || — || November 15, 2006 || Kitt Peak || Spacewatch || — || align=right | 2.2 km || 
|-id=395 bgcolor=#d6d6d6
| 361395 ||  || — || November 15, 2006 || Kitt Peak || Spacewatch || SAN || align=right | 1.7 km || 
|-id=396 bgcolor=#E9E9E9
| 361396 ||  || — || November 14, 2006 || Kitt Peak || Spacewatch || AGN || align=right | 1.3 km || 
|-id=397 bgcolor=#E9E9E9
| 361397 ||  || — || November 2, 2006 || Mount Lemmon || Mount Lemmon Survey || — || align=right | 1.4 km || 
|-id=398 bgcolor=#fefefe
| 361398 ||  || — || November 17, 2006 || Catalina || CSS || H || align=right | 1.2 km || 
|-id=399 bgcolor=#d6d6d6
| 361399 ||  || — || November 16, 2006 || Kitt Peak || Spacewatch || — || align=right | 2.2 km || 
|-id=400 bgcolor=#E9E9E9
| 361400 ||  || — || November 16, 2006 || Kitt Peak || Spacewatch || — || align=right | 2.2 km || 
|}

361401–361500 

|-bgcolor=#E9E9E9
| 361401 ||  || — || November 16, 2006 || Kitt Peak || Spacewatch || AGN || align=right | 1.1 km || 
|-id=402 bgcolor=#E9E9E9
| 361402 ||  || — || November 16, 2006 || Kitt Peak || Spacewatch || NEM || align=right | 2.7 km || 
|-id=403 bgcolor=#E9E9E9
| 361403 ||  || — || March 16, 2004 || Kitt Peak || Spacewatch || — || align=right | 2.5 km || 
|-id=404 bgcolor=#d6d6d6
| 361404 ||  || — || November 17, 2006 || Mount Lemmon || Mount Lemmon Survey || — || align=right | 2.9 km || 
|-id=405 bgcolor=#E9E9E9
| 361405 ||  || — || November 17, 2006 || Kitt Peak || Spacewatch || — || align=right | 3.5 km || 
|-id=406 bgcolor=#E9E9E9
| 361406 ||  || — || November 18, 2006 || Kitt Peak || Spacewatch || — || align=right | 1.9 km || 
|-id=407 bgcolor=#E9E9E9
| 361407 ||  || — || November 18, 2006 || Socorro || LINEAR || EUN || align=right | 2.1 km || 
|-id=408 bgcolor=#E9E9E9
| 361408 ||  || — || November 19, 2006 || Kitt Peak || Spacewatch || — || align=right | 2.8 km || 
|-id=409 bgcolor=#E9E9E9
| 361409 ||  || — || November 19, 2006 || Kitt Peak || Spacewatch || AGN || align=right | 1.2 km || 
|-id=410 bgcolor=#E9E9E9
| 361410 ||  || — || October 31, 2006 || Mount Lemmon || Mount Lemmon Survey || AGN || align=right | 1.1 km || 
|-id=411 bgcolor=#d6d6d6
| 361411 ||  || — || November 19, 2006 || Kitt Peak || Spacewatch || KOR || align=right | 1.4 km || 
|-id=412 bgcolor=#E9E9E9
| 361412 ||  || — || November 22, 2006 || Kitt Peak || Spacewatch || — || align=right | 2.5 km || 
|-id=413 bgcolor=#FA8072
| 361413 ||  || — || November 17, 2006 || Catalina || CSS || H || align=right data-sort-value="0.72" | 720 m || 
|-id=414 bgcolor=#E9E9E9
| 361414 ||  || — || November 20, 2006 || Kitt Peak || Spacewatch || — || align=right | 1.5 km || 
|-id=415 bgcolor=#fefefe
| 361415 ||  || — || November 21, 2006 || Mount Lemmon || Mount Lemmon Survey || — || align=right data-sort-value="0.96" | 960 m || 
|-id=416 bgcolor=#E9E9E9
| 361416 ||  || — || November 23, 2006 || Kitt Peak || Spacewatch || — || align=right | 2.5 km || 
|-id=417 bgcolor=#E9E9E9
| 361417 ||  || — || November 23, 2006 || Kitt Peak || Spacewatch || EUN || align=right | 1.3 km || 
|-id=418 bgcolor=#d6d6d6
| 361418 ||  || — || November 23, 2006 || Kitt Peak || Spacewatch || KOR || align=right | 1.3 km || 
|-id=419 bgcolor=#E9E9E9
| 361419 ||  || — || November 23, 2006 || Mount Lemmon || Mount Lemmon Survey || — || align=right | 1.9 km || 
|-id=420 bgcolor=#d6d6d6
| 361420 ||  || — || November 24, 2006 || Mount Lemmon || Mount Lemmon Survey || CHA || align=right | 2.1 km || 
|-id=421 bgcolor=#d6d6d6
| 361421 ||  || — || November 17, 2006 || Kitt Peak || Spacewatch || — || align=right | 3.3 km || 
|-id=422 bgcolor=#fefefe
| 361422 ||  || — || December 12, 2006 || Palomar || NEAT || H || align=right | 1.0 km || 
|-id=423 bgcolor=#d6d6d6
| 361423 ||  || — || December 9, 2006 || Kitt Peak || Spacewatch || — || align=right | 2.6 km || 
|-id=424 bgcolor=#d6d6d6
| 361424 ||  || — || December 9, 2006 || Kitt Peak || Spacewatch || — || align=right | 4.0 km || 
|-id=425 bgcolor=#fefefe
| 361425 ||  || — || December 11, 2006 || Socorro || LINEAR || H || align=right data-sort-value="0.81" | 810 m || 
|-id=426 bgcolor=#E9E9E9
| 361426 ||  || — || December 13, 2006 || Mount Lemmon || Mount Lemmon Survey || AST || align=right | 1.6 km || 
|-id=427 bgcolor=#E9E9E9
| 361427 ||  || — || December 13, 2006 || Mount Lemmon || Mount Lemmon Survey || — || align=right | 3.2 km || 
|-id=428 bgcolor=#d6d6d6
| 361428 ||  || — || December 13, 2006 || Mount Lemmon || Mount Lemmon Survey || — || align=right | 3.1 km || 
|-id=429 bgcolor=#E9E9E9
| 361429 ||  || — || December 21, 2006 || Mount Lemmon || Mount Lemmon Survey || — || align=right | 1.9 km || 
|-id=430 bgcolor=#fefefe
| 361430 ||  || — || December 21, 2006 || Mount Lemmon || Mount Lemmon Survey || H || align=right data-sort-value="0.94" | 940 m || 
|-id=431 bgcolor=#E9E9E9
| 361431 ||  || — || December 23, 2006 || Catalina || CSS || — || align=right | 2.0 km || 
|-id=432 bgcolor=#d6d6d6
| 361432 ||  || — || December 21, 2006 || Kitt Peak || Spacewatch || — || align=right | 3.8 km || 
|-id=433 bgcolor=#d6d6d6
| 361433 ||  || — || December 24, 2006 || Kitt Peak || Spacewatch || — || align=right | 3.1 km || 
|-id=434 bgcolor=#d6d6d6
| 361434 ||  || — || January 10, 2007 || Nyukasa || Mount Nyukasa Stn. || — || align=right | 3.1 km || 
|-id=435 bgcolor=#d6d6d6
| 361435 ||  || — || January 10, 2007 || Kitt Peak || Spacewatch || — || align=right | 3.1 km || 
|-id=436 bgcolor=#d6d6d6
| 361436 ||  || — || January 15, 2007 || Anderson Mesa || LONEOS || Tj (2.99) || align=right | 4.3 km || 
|-id=437 bgcolor=#d6d6d6
| 361437 ||  || — || January 10, 2007 || Kitt Peak || Spacewatch || — || align=right | 2.9 km || 
|-id=438 bgcolor=#d6d6d6
| 361438 ||  || — || January 10, 2007 || Mount Lemmon || Mount Lemmon Survey || HYG || align=right | 3.1 km || 
|-id=439 bgcolor=#d6d6d6
| 361439 ||  || — || January 17, 2007 || Kitt Peak || Spacewatch || — || align=right | 2.5 km || 
|-id=440 bgcolor=#d6d6d6
| 361440 ||  || — || January 17, 2007 || Kitt Peak || Spacewatch || — || align=right | 2.3 km || 
|-id=441 bgcolor=#d6d6d6
| 361441 ||  || — || January 17, 2007 || Kitt Peak || Spacewatch || THM || align=right | 2.0 km || 
|-id=442 bgcolor=#d6d6d6
| 361442 ||  || — || January 17, 2007 || Kitt Peak || Spacewatch || THM || align=right | 1.8 km || 
|-id=443 bgcolor=#d6d6d6
| 361443 ||  || — || January 24, 2007 || Mount Lemmon || Mount Lemmon Survey || THM || align=right | 2.0 km || 
|-id=444 bgcolor=#d6d6d6
| 361444 ||  || — || January 24, 2007 || Catalina || CSS || EOS || align=right | 2.3 km || 
|-id=445 bgcolor=#d6d6d6
| 361445 ||  || — || January 24, 2007 || Mount Lemmon || Mount Lemmon Survey || — || align=right | 2.5 km || 
|-id=446 bgcolor=#d6d6d6
| 361446 ||  || — || January 17, 2007 || Kitt Peak || Spacewatch || — || align=right | 3.1 km || 
|-id=447 bgcolor=#d6d6d6
| 361447 ||  || — || January 27, 2007 || Mount Lemmon || Mount Lemmon Survey || — || align=right | 2.9 km || 
|-id=448 bgcolor=#d6d6d6
| 361448 ||  || — || January 28, 2007 || Mount Lemmon || Mount Lemmon Survey || EOS || align=right | 1.8 km || 
|-id=449 bgcolor=#d6d6d6
| 361449 ||  || — || January 28, 2007 || Mount Lemmon || Mount Lemmon Survey || HYG || align=right | 2.7 km || 
|-id=450 bgcolor=#d6d6d6
| 361450 Houellebecq ||  ||  || January 21, 2007 || Nogales || J.-C. Merlin || — || align=right | 3.0 km || 
|-id=451 bgcolor=#d6d6d6
| 361451 ||  || — || January 27, 2007 || Kitt Peak || Spacewatch || THM || align=right | 2.0 km || 
|-id=452 bgcolor=#d6d6d6
| 361452 ||  || — || January 28, 2007 || Catalina || CSS || MEL || align=right | 4.1 km || 
|-id=453 bgcolor=#d6d6d6
| 361453 ||  || — || December 27, 2006 || Mount Lemmon || Mount Lemmon Survey || — || align=right | 2.9 km || 
|-id=454 bgcolor=#d6d6d6
| 361454 ||  || — || February 6, 2007 || Kitt Peak || Spacewatch || — || align=right | 3.0 km || 
|-id=455 bgcolor=#d6d6d6
| 361455 ||  || — || February 8, 2007 || Mount Lemmon || Mount Lemmon Survey || — || align=right | 2.7 km || 
|-id=456 bgcolor=#d6d6d6
| 361456 ||  || — || February 6, 2007 || Mount Lemmon || Mount Lemmon Survey || BRA || align=right | 1.9 km || 
|-id=457 bgcolor=#d6d6d6
| 361457 ||  || — || February 5, 2007 || Palomar || NEAT || — || align=right | 2.6 km || 
|-id=458 bgcolor=#d6d6d6
| 361458 ||  || — || February 6, 2007 || Kitt Peak || Spacewatch || THM || align=right | 2.2 km || 
|-id=459 bgcolor=#d6d6d6
| 361459 ||  || — || February 6, 2007 || Mount Lemmon || Mount Lemmon Survey || EOS || align=right | 2.0 km || 
|-id=460 bgcolor=#d6d6d6
| 361460 ||  || — || February 6, 2007 || Mount Lemmon || Mount Lemmon Survey || — || align=right | 2.4 km || 
|-id=461 bgcolor=#d6d6d6
| 361461 ||  || — || November 22, 2006 || Mount Lemmon || Mount Lemmon Survey || — || align=right | 4.1 km || 
|-id=462 bgcolor=#d6d6d6
| 361462 ||  || — || February 10, 2007 || Catalina || CSS || TIR || align=right | 4.0 km || 
|-id=463 bgcolor=#d6d6d6
| 361463 ||  || — || February 10, 2007 || Catalina || CSS || — || align=right | 3.4 km || 
|-id=464 bgcolor=#d6d6d6
| 361464 ||  || — || February 15, 2007 || Palomar || NEAT || THM || align=right | 2.9 km || 
|-id=465 bgcolor=#d6d6d6
| 361465 ||  || — || February 14, 2007 || Mauna Kea || Mauna Kea Obs. || — || align=right | 2.7 km || 
|-id=466 bgcolor=#d6d6d6
| 361466 ||  || — || February 17, 2007 || Kitt Peak || Spacewatch || EOS || align=right | 1.9 km || 
|-id=467 bgcolor=#d6d6d6
| 361467 ||  || — || February 17, 2007 || Kitt Peak || Spacewatch || HYG || align=right | 2.3 km || 
|-id=468 bgcolor=#d6d6d6
| 361468 ||  || — || February 17, 2007 || Kitt Peak || Spacewatch || VER || align=right | 2.5 km || 
|-id=469 bgcolor=#d6d6d6
| 361469 ||  || — || February 17, 2007 || Kitt Peak || Spacewatch || THM || align=right | 2.3 km || 
|-id=470 bgcolor=#d6d6d6
| 361470 ||  || — || November 21, 2006 || Mount Lemmon || Mount Lemmon Survey || — || align=right | 4.6 km || 
|-id=471 bgcolor=#d6d6d6
| 361471 ||  || — || February 17, 2007 || Kitt Peak || Spacewatch || — || align=right | 3.8 km || 
|-id=472 bgcolor=#d6d6d6
| 361472 ||  || — || November 1, 2006 || Mount Lemmon || Mount Lemmon Survey || — || align=right | 4.3 km || 
|-id=473 bgcolor=#d6d6d6
| 361473 ||  || — || February 17, 2007 || Mount Lemmon || Mount Lemmon Survey || — || align=right | 2.6 km || 
|-id=474 bgcolor=#d6d6d6
| 361474 ||  || — || February 21, 2007 || Mount Lemmon || Mount Lemmon Survey || ALA || align=right | 4.7 km || 
|-id=475 bgcolor=#d6d6d6
| 361475 ||  || — || April 21, 2002 || Palomar || NEAT || ALA || align=right | 3.9 km || 
|-id=476 bgcolor=#d6d6d6
| 361476 ||  || — || February 19, 2007 || Mount Lemmon || Mount Lemmon Survey || EOS || align=right | 2.2 km || 
|-id=477 bgcolor=#d6d6d6
| 361477 ||  || — || February 21, 2007 || Socorro || LINEAR || — || align=right | 3.5 km || 
|-id=478 bgcolor=#d6d6d6
| 361478 ||  || — || February 21, 2007 || Kitt Peak || Spacewatch || — || align=right | 2.6 km || 
|-id=479 bgcolor=#d6d6d6
| 361479 ||  || — || January 28, 2007 || Catalina || CSS || Tj (2.99) || align=right | 3.9 km || 
|-id=480 bgcolor=#d6d6d6
| 361480 ||  || — || February 23, 2007 || Mount Lemmon || Mount Lemmon Survey || EUP || align=right | 3.6 km || 
|-id=481 bgcolor=#d6d6d6
| 361481 ||  || — || February 21, 2007 || Mount Lemmon || Mount Lemmon Survey || HYG || align=right | 2.9 km || 
|-id=482 bgcolor=#d6d6d6
| 361482 ||  || — || February 23, 2007 || Mount Lemmon || Mount Lemmon Survey || — || align=right | 2.9 km || 
|-id=483 bgcolor=#d6d6d6
| 361483 ||  || — || February 23, 2007 || Kitt Peak || Spacewatch || — || align=right | 3.1 km || 
|-id=484 bgcolor=#d6d6d6
| 361484 ||  || — || February 23, 2007 || Kitt Peak || Spacewatch || — || align=right | 3.3 km || 
|-id=485 bgcolor=#d6d6d6
| 361485 ||  || — || February 25, 2007 || Mount Lemmon || Mount Lemmon Survey || TIR || align=right | 2.9 km || 
|-id=486 bgcolor=#d6d6d6
| 361486 ||  || — || February 25, 2007 || Mount Lemmon || Mount Lemmon Survey || — || align=right | 5.1 km || 
|-id=487 bgcolor=#d6d6d6
| 361487 ||  || — || February 21, 2007 || Kitt Peak || M. W. Buie || — || align=right | 4.1 km || 
|-id=488 bgcolor=#d6d6d6
| 361488 ||  || — || February 17, 2007 || Mount Lemmon || Mount Lemmon Survey || — || align=right | 3.5 km || 
|-id=489 bgcolor=#d6d6d6
| 361489 ||  || — || February 25, 2007 || Mount Lemmon || Mount Lemmon Survey || — || align=right | 3.4 km || 
|-id=490 bgcolor=#d6d6d6
| 361490 ||  || — || February 17, 2007 || Catalina || CSS || — || align=right | 3.0 km || 
|-id=491 bgcolor=#d6d6d6
| 361491 ||  || — || February 27, 2007 || Kitt Peak || Spacewatch || VER || align=right | 3.2 km || 
|-id=492 bgcolor=#d6d6d6
| 361492 ||  || — || February 26, 2007 || Mount Lemmon || Mount Lemmon Survey || — || align=right | 4.4 km || 
|-id=493 bgcolor=#d6d6d6
| 361493 ||  || — || March 9, 2007 || Catalina || CSS || EUP || align=right | 4.2 km || 
|-id=494 bgcolor=#d6d6d6
| 361494 ||  || — || August 14, 2004 || Cerro Tololo || L. H. Wasserman || — || align=right | 3.4 km || 
|-id=495 bgcolor=#d6d6d6
| 361495 ||  || — || March 9, 2007 || Palomar || NEAT || — || align=right | 3.5 km || 
|-id=496 bgcolor=#d6d6d6
| 361496 ||  || — || March 10, 2007 || Kitt Peak || Spacewatch || — || align=right | 2.6 km || 
|-id=497 bgcolor=#d6d6d6
| 361497 ||  || — || March 10, 2007 || Kitt Peak || Spacewatch || — || align=right | 3.0 km || 
|-id=498 bgcolor=#d6d6d6
| 361498 ||  || — || March 11, 2007 || Mount Lemmon || Mount Lemmon Survey || — || align=right | 3.6 km || 
|-id=499 bgcolor=#d6d6d6
| 361499 ||  || — || March 10, 2007 || Palomar || NEAT || — || align=right | 4.5 km || 
|-id=500 bgcolor=#d6d6d6
| 361500 ||  || — || March 10, 2007 || Kitt Peak || Spacewatch || — || align=right | 3.9 km || 
|}

361501–361600 

|-bgcolor=#d6d6d6
| 361501 ||  || — || March 10, 2007 || Mount Lemmon || Mount Lemmon Survey || — || align=right | 3.2 km || 
|-id=502 bgcolor=#d6d6d6
| 361502 ||  || — || October 25, 2005 || Kitt Peak || Spacewatch || THM || align=right | 2.3 km || 
|-id=503 bgcolor=#d6d6d6
| 361503 ||  || — || March 11, 2007 || Mount Lemmon || Mount Lemmon Survey || ELF || align=right | 3.7 km || 
|-id=504 bgcolor=#d6d6d6
| 361504 ||  || — || March 11, 2007 || Kitt Peak || Spacewatch || — || align=right | 4.0 km || 
|-id=505 bgcolor=#d6d6d6
| 361505 ||  || — || March 13, 2007 || Catalina || CSS || — || align=right | 3.3 km || 
|-id=506 bgcolor=#d6d6d6
| 361506 ||  || — || March 9, 2007 || Kitt Peak || Spacewatch || — || align=right | 5.0 km || 
|-id=507 bgcolor=#d6d6d6
| 361507 ||  || — || March 10, 2007 || Mount Lemmon || Mount Lemmon Survey || URS || align=right | 3.5 km || 
|-id=508 bgcolor=#d6d6d6
| 361508 ||  || — || March 10, 2007 || Catalina || CSS || EUP || align=right | 6.4 km || 
|-id=509 bgcolor=#d6d6d6
| 361509 ||  || — || February 26, 2007 || Mount Lemmon || Mount Lemmon Survey || — || align=right | 3.7 km || 
|-id=510 bgcolor=#d6d6d6
| 361510 ||  || — || December 24, 2006 || Mount Lemmon || Mount Lemmon Survey || — || align=right | 2.7 km || 
|-id=511 bgcolor=#d6d6d6
| 361511 ||  || — || March 14, 2007 || Kitt Peak || Spacewatch || EUP || align=right | 4.0 km || 
|-id=512 bgcolor=#d6d6d6
| 361512 ||  || — || March 11, 2007 || Kitt Peak || Spacewatch || TIR || align=right | 3.4 km || 
|-id=513 bgcolor=#d6d6d6
| 361513 ||  || — || March 9, 2007 || Catalina || CSS || — || align=right | 3.7 km || 
|-id=514 bgcolor=#d6d6d6
| 361514 ||  || — || November 28, 2006 || Kitt Peak || Spacewatch || — || align=right | 4.3 km || 
|-id=515 bgcolor=#d6d6d6
| 361515 ||  || — || March 13, 2007 || Catalina || CSS || LIX || align=right | 4.5 km || 
|-id=516 bgcolor=#d6d6d6
| 361516 ||  || — || March 15, 2007 || Kitt Peak || Spacewatch || — || align=right | 3.0 km || 
|-id=517 bgcolor=#d6d6d6
| 361517 ||  || — || March 13, 2007 || Kitt Peak || Spacewatch || — || align=right | 3.7 km || 
|-id=518 bgcolor=#FFC2E0
| 361518 ||  || — || March 16, 2007 || Kitt Peak || Spacewatch || APO +1km || align=right | 1.3 km || 
|-id=519 bgcolor=#d6d6d6
| 361519 ||  || — || January 17, 2007 || Palomar || NEAT || — || align=right | 5.0 km || 
|-id=520 bgcolor=#d6d6d6
| 361520 ||  || — || March 17, 2007 || Anderson Mesa || LONEOS || — || align=right | 4.9 km || 
|-id=521 bgcolor=#d6d6d6
| 361521 ||  || — || March 25, 2007 || Pla D'Arguines || R. Ferrando || LIX || align=right | 4.4 km || 
|-id=522 bgcolor=#d6d6d6
| 361522 ||  || — || March 20, 2007 || Mount Lemmon || Mount Lemmon Survey || — || align=right | 3.0 km || 
|-id=523 bgcolor=#d6d6d6
| 361523 ||  || — || March 25, 2007 || Altschwendt || W. Ries || — || align=right | 3.5 km || 
|-id=524 bgcolor=#d6d6d6
| 361524 Klimka ||  ||  || March 24, 2007 || Moletai || K. Černis, J. Zdanavičius || — || align=right | 3.6 km || 
|-id=525 bgcolor=#d6d6d6
| 361525 ||  || — || March 17, 2007 || Catalina || CSS || EUP || align=right | 3.4 km || 
|-id=526 bgcolor=#d6d6d6
| 361526 ||  || — || March 26, 2007 || Kitt Peak || Spacewatch || THM || align=right | 2.3 km || 
|-id=527 bgcolor=#d6d6d6
| 361527 ||  || — || April 14, 2007 || Mount Lemmon || Mount Lemmon Survey || EUP || align=right | 4.0 km || 
|-id=528 bgcolor=#d6d6d6
| 361528 ||  || — || April 14, 2007 || Kitt Peak || Spacewatch || — || align=right | 3.7 km || 
|-id=529 bgcolor=#d6d6d6
| 361529 ||  || — || April 15, 2007 || Kitt Peak || Spacewatch || ALA || align=right | 3.7 km || 
|-id=530 bgcolor=#d6d6d6
| 361530 Victorfranzhess ||  ||  || April 22, 2007 || Gaisberg || R. Gierlinger || — || align=right | 3.0 km || 
|-id=531 bgcolor=#d6d6d6
| 361531 ||  || — || February 17, 2007 || Mount Lemmon || Mount Lemmon Survey || LIX || align=right | 3.4 km || 
|-id=532 bgcolor=#FFC2E0
| 361532 ||  || — || April 22, 2007 || Mount Lemmon || Mount Lemmon Survey || AMO || align=right data-sort-value="0.48" | 480 m || 
|-id=533 bgcolor=#d6d6d6
| 361533 ||  || — || April 15, 2007 || Catalina || CSS || EOS || align=right | 3.2 km || 
|-id=534 bgcolor=#d6d6d6
| 361534 ||  || — || April 19, 2007 || Mount Lemmon || Mount Lemmon Survey || — || align=right | 3.8 km || 
|-id=535 bgcolor=#d6d6d6
| 361535 ||  || — || April 16, 2007 || Catalina || CSS || — || align=right | 3.7 km || 
|-id=536 bgcolor=#d6d6d6
| 361536 ||  || — || May 9, 2007 || Mount Lemmon || Mount Lemmon Survey || SYL7:4 || align=right | 4.2 km || 
|-id=537 bgcolor=#FA8072
| 361537 ||  || — || May 11, 2007 || Catalina || CSS || — || align=right data-sort-value="0.71" | 710 m || 
|-id=538 bgcolor=#FFC2E0
| 361538 ||  || — || May 11, 2007 || Socorro || LINEAR || APO || align=right data-sort-value="0.48" | 480 m || 
|-id=539 bgcolor=#FA8072
| 361539 ||  || — || May 23, 2007 || Mount Lemmon || Mount Lemmon Survey || — || align=right data-sort-value="0.77" | 770 m || 
|-id=540 bgcolor=#E9E9E9
| 361540 ||  || — || August 9, 2007 || Bisei SG Center || BATTeRS || INO || align=right | 1.7 km || 
|-id=541 bgcolor=#fefefe
| 361541 ||  || — || September 24, 2000 || Socorro || LINEAR || V || align=right data-sort-value="0.87" | 870 m || 
|-id=542 bgcolor=#fefefe
| 361542 ||  || — || August 12, 2007 || Socorro || LINEAR || FLO || align=right data-sort-value="0.75" | 750 m || 
|-id=543 bgcolor=#fefefe
| 361543 ||  || — || August 12, 2007 || Socorro || LINEAR || FLO || align=right data-sort-value="0.70" | 700 m || 
|-id=544 bgcolor=#fefefe
| 361544 ||  || — || August 7, 2007 || Palomar || Palomar Obs. || — || align=right data-sort-value="0.72" | 720 m || 
|-id=545 bgcolor=#fefefe
| 361545 ||  || — || August 8, 2007 || Siding Spring || SSS || FLO || align=right data-sort-value="0.73" | 730 m || 
|-id=546 bgcolor=#fefefe
| 361546 ||  || — || August 10, 2007 || Kitt Peak || Spacewatch || — || align=right data-sort-value="0.81" | 810 m || 
|-id=547 bgcolor=#fefefe
| 361547 ||  || — || August 13, 2007 || Socorro || LINEAR || V || align=right data-sort-value="0.79" | 790 m || 
|-id=548 bgcolor=#FA8072
| 361548 ||  || — || August 15, 2007 || Socorro || LINEAR || — || align=right data-sort-value="0.78" | 780 m || 
|-id=549 bgcolor=#fefefe
| 361549 ||  || — || August 8, 2007 || Socorro || LINEAR || V || align=right data-sort-value="0.66" | 660 m || 
|-id=550 bgcolor=#fefefe
| 361550 ||  || — || August 21, 2007 || Anderson Mesa || LONEOS || NYS || align=right data-sort-value="0.84" | 840 m || 
|-id=551 bgcolor=#fefefe
| 361551 ||  || — || August 21, 2007 || Anderson Mesa || LONEOS || — || align=right data-sort-value="0.81" | 810 m || 
|-id=552 bgcolor=#fefefe
| 361552 ||  || — || August 21, 2007 || Anderson Mesa || LONEOS || — || align=right | 1.0 km || 
|-id=553 bgcolor=#fefefe
| 361553 ||  || — || August 23, 2007 || Kitt Peak || Spacewatch || — || align=right data-sort-value="0.80" | 800 m || 
|-id=554 bgcolor=#fefefe
| 361554 ||  || — || August 21, 2007 || Anderson Mesa || LONEOS || — || align=right data-sort-value="0.87" | 870 m || 
|-id=555 bgcolor=#fefefe
| 361555 ||  || — || August 21, 2007 || Anderson Mesa || LONEOS || — || align=right data-sort-value="0.91" | 910 m || 
|-id=556 bgcolor=#fefefe
| 361556 || 2007 RJ || — || September 1, 2007 || Dauban || Chante-Perdrix Obs. || — || align=right data-sort-value="0.79" | 790 m || 
|-id=557 bgcolor=#fefefe
| 361557 ||  || — || September 2, 2007 || Mount Lemmon || Mount Lemmon Survey || — || align=right | 1.3 km || 
|-id=558 bgcolor=#fefefe
| 361558 ||  || — || September 3, 2007 || Catalina || CSS || — || align=right data-sort-value="0.85" | 850 m || 
|-id=559 bgcolor=#fefefe
| 361559 ||  || — || September 2, 2007 || Mount Lemmon || Mount Lemmon Survey || — || align=right | 2.1 km || 
|-id=560 bgcolor=#fefefe
| 361560 ||  || — || September 11, 2007 || Dauban || Chante-Perdrix Obs. || — || align=right data-sort-value="0.78" | 780 m || 
|-id=561 bgcolor=#fefefe
| 361561 ||  || — || September 8, 2007 || Anderson Mesa || LONEOS || NYS || align=right data-sort-value="0.91" | 910 m || 
|-id=562 bgcolor=#fefefe
| 361562 ||  || — || September 9, 2007 || Anderson Mesa || LONEOS || FLO || align=right data-sort-value="0.71" | 710 m || 
|-id=563 bgcolor=#fefefe
| 361563 ||  || — || September 9, 2007 || Kitt Peak || Spacewatch || V || align=right data-sort-value="0.75" | 750 m || 
|-id=564 bgcolor=#fefefe
| 361564 ||  || — || September 9, 2007 || Kitt Peak || Spacewatch || FLO || align=right | 1.1 km || 
|-id=565 bgcolor=#FA8072
| 361565 ||  || — || September 9, 2007 || Kitt Peak || Spacewatch || — || align=right | 1.2 km || 
|-id=566 bgcolor=#fefefe
| 361566 ||  || — || September 10, 2007 || Kitt Peak || Spacewatch || FLO || align=right data-sort-value="0.63" | 630 m || 
|-id=567 bgcolor=#fefefe
| 361567 ||  || — || September 10, 2007 || Mount Lemmon || Mount Lemmon Survey || V || align=right data-sort-value="0.65" | 650 m || 
|-id=568 bgcolor=#fefefe
| 361568 ||  || — || September 10, 2007 || Kitt Peak || Spacewatch || FLO || align=right data-sort-value="0.75" | 750 m || 
|-id=569 bgcolor=#E9E9E9
| 361569 ||  || — || February 2, 2000 || Socorro || LINEAR || — || align=right | 1.3 km || 
|-id=570 bgcolor=#fefefe
| 361570 ||  || — || September 10, 2007 || Kitt Peak || Spacewatch || FLO || align=right data-sort-value="0.84" | 840 m || 
|-id=571 bgcolor=#fefefe
| 361571 ||  || — || September 10, 2007 || Kitt Peak || Spacewatch || — || align=right data-sort-value="0.97" | 970 m || 
|-id=572 bgcolor=#fefefe
| 361572 ||  || — || September 12, 2007 || Mount Lemmon || Mount Lemmon Survey || MAS || align=right data-sort-value="0.69" | 690 m || 
|-id=573 bgcolor=#fefefe
| 361573 ||  || — || September 14, 2007 || Mount Lemmon || Mount Lemmon Survey || MAS || align=right data-sort-value="0.81" | 810 m || 
|-id=574 bgcolor=#fefefe
| 361574 ||  || — || September 13, 2007 || Socorro || LINEAR || — || align=right | 1.1 km || 
|-id=575 bgcolor=#fefefe
| 361575 ||  || — || September 14, 2007 || Socorro || LINEAR || FLO || align=right data-sort-value="0.83" | 830 m || 
|-id=576 bgcolor=#fefefe
| 361576 ||  || — || September 12, 2007 || Catalina || CSS || FLO || align=right data-sort-value="0.85" | 850 m || 
|-id=577 bgcolor=#fefefe
| 361577 ||  || — || August 24, 2007 || Kitt Peak || Spacewatch || — || align=right data-sort-value="0.86" | 860 m || 
|-id=578 bgcolor=#fefefe
| 361578 ||  || — || April 2, 2006 || Kitt Peak || Spacewatch || V || align=right data-sort-value="0.73" | 730 m || 
|-id=579 bgcolor=#fefefe
| 361579 ||  || — || September 10, 2007 || Kitt Peak || Spacewatch || — || align=right | 1.1 km || 
|-id=580 bgcolor=#fefefe
| 361580 ||  || — || September 13, 2007 || Catalina || CSS || V || align=right data-sort-value="0.78" | 780 m || 
|-id=581 bgcolor=#fefefe
| 361581 ||  || — || September 10, 2007 || Kitt Peak || Spacewatch || NYS || align=right data-sort-value="0.76" | 760 m || 
|-id=582 bgcolor=#fefefe
| 361582 ||  || — || September 10, 2007 || Kitt Peak || Spacewatch || MAS || align=right data-sort-value="0.90" | 900 m || 
|-id=583 bgcolor=#E9E9E9
| 361583 ||  || — || September 10, 2007 || Mount Lemmon || Mount Lemmon Survey || — || align=right | 1.1 km || 
|-id=584 bgcolor=#fefefe
| 361584 ||  || — || September 12, 2007 || Catalina || CSS || V || align=right data-sort-value="0.92" | 920 m || 
|-id=585 bgcolor=#fefefe
| 361585 ||  || — || September 14, 2007 || Catalina || CSS || — || align=right data-sort-value="0.96" | 960 m || 
|-id=586 bgcolor=#FA8072
| 361586 ||  || — || September 14, 2007 || Catalina || CSS || — || align=right data-sort-value="0.87" | 870 m || 
|-id=587 bgcolor=#fefefe
| 361587 ||  || — || September 10, 2007 || Catalina || CSS || V || align=right data-sort-value="0.75" | 750 m || 
|-id=588 bgcolor=#fefefe
| 361588 ||  || — || September 15, 2007 || Socorro || LINEAR || — || align=right data-sort-value="0.75" | 750 m || 
|-id=589 bgcolor=#fefefe
| 361589 ||  || — || September 15, 2007 || Socorro || LINEAR || V || align=right data-sort-value="0.85" | 850 m || 
|-id=590 bgcolor=#fefefe
| 361590 ||  || — || September 11, 2007 || Kitt Peak || Spacewatch || — || align=right data-sort-value="0.90" | 900 m || 
|-id=591 bgcolor=#fefefe
| 361591 ||  || — || September 13, 2007 || Catalina || CSS || V || align=right data-sort-value="0.75" | 750 m || 
|-id=592 bgcolor=#fefefe
| 361592 ||  || — || September 14, 2007 || Mount Lemmon || Mount Lemmon Survey || FLO || align=right data-sort-value="0.56" | 560 m || 
|-id=593 bgcolor=#fefefe
| 361593 ||  || — || September 5, 2007 || Catalina || CSS || — || align=right data-sort-value="0.94" | 940 m || 
|-id=594 bgcolor=#E9E9E9
| 361594 ||  || — || September 12, 2007 || Mount Lemmon || Mount Lemmon Survey || — || align=right data-sort-value="0.87" | 870 m || 
|-id=595 bgcolor=#fefefe
| 361595 ||  || — || September 12, 2007 || Mount Lemmon || Mount Lemmon Survey || FLO || align=right data-sort-value="0.62" | 620 m || 
|-id=596 bgcolor=#E9E9E9
| 361596 ||  || — || September 10, 2007 || Mount Lemmon || Mount Lemmon Survey || — || align=right data-sort-value="0.92" | 920 m || 
|-id=597 bgcolor=#fefefe
| 361597 ||  || — || September 13, 2007 || Mount Lemmon || Mount Lemmon Survey || — || align=right | 1.0 km || 
|-id=598 bgcolor=#fefefe
| 361598 ||  || — || September 14, 2007 || Mount Lemmon || Mount Lemmon Survey || — || align=right data-sort-value="0.78" | 780 m || 
|-id=599 bgcolor=#fefefe
| 361599 ||  || — || September 2, 2007 || Catalina || CSS || V || align=right data-sort-value="0.83" | 830 m || 
|-id=600 bgcolor=#fefefe
| 361600 ||  || — || September 9, 2007 || Kitt Peak || Spacewatch || V || align=right data-sort-value="0.59" | 590 m || 
|}

361601–361700 

|-bgcolor=#fefefe
| 361601 ||  || — || September 12, 2007 || Mount Lemmon || Mount Lemmon Survey || MAS || align=right data-sort-value="0.80" | 800 m || 
|-id=602 bgcolor=#fefefe
| 361602 ||  || — || September 13, 2007 || Kitt Peak || Spacewatch || — || align=right data-sort-value="0.87" | 870 m || 
|-id=603 bgcolor=#E9E9E9
| 361603 ||  || — || September 14, 2007 || Mount Lemmon || Mount Lemmon Survey || — || align=right | 1.1 km || 
|-id=604 bgcolor=#E9E9E9
| 361604 ||  || — || September 20, 2007 || Catalina || CSS || — || align=right | 2.0 km || 
|-id=605 bgcolor=#fefefe
| 361605 ||  || — || September 30, 2007 || Kitt Peak || Spacewatch || — || align=right data-sort-value="0.67" | 670 m || 
|-id=606 bgcolor=#fefefe
| 361606 ||  || — || September 26, 2007 || Mount Lemmon || Mount Lemmon Survey || — || align=right | 1.1 km || 
|-id=607 bgcolor=#E9E9E9
| 361607 ||  || — || September 24, 2007 || Socorro || LINEAR || BAR || align=right | 1.4 km || 
|-id=608 bgcolor=#fefefe
| 361608 ||  || — || October 3, 2007 || Calvin-Rehoboth || L. A. Molnar || SUL || align=right | 2.1 km || 
|-id=609 bgcolor=#E9E9E9
| 361609 ||  || — || October 7, 2007 || Dauban || Chante-Perdrix Obs. || — || align=right | 1.7 km || 
|-id=610 bgcolor=#fefefe
| 361610 ||  || — || September 20, 2007 || Kitt Peak || Spacewatch || NYS || align=right data-sort-value="0.78" | 780 m || 
|-id=611 bgcolor=#FFC2E0
| 361611 ||  || — || October 9, 2007 || Kitt Peak || Spacewatch || AMO +1kmcritical || align=right data-sort-value="0.81" | 810 m || 
|-id=612 bgcolor=#fefefe
| 361612 ||  || — || October 4, 2007 || Kitt Peak || Spacewatch || MAS || align=right data-sort-value="0.85" | 850 m || 
|-id=613 bgcolor=#fefefe
| 361613 ||  || — || September 13, 2007 || Mount Lemmon || Mount Lemmon Survey || — || align=right | 1.1 km || 
|-id=614 bgcolor=#fefefe
| 361614 ||  || — || October 4, 2007 || Kitt Peak || Spacewatch || — || align=right data-sort-value="0.81" | 810 m || 
|-id=615 bgcolor=#fefefe
| 361615 ||  || — || October 4, 2007 || Kitt Peak || Spacewatch || V || align=right data-sort-value="0.85" | 850 m || 
|-id=616 bgcolor=#fefefe
| 361616 ||  || — || October 7, 2007 || Mount Lemmon || Mount Lemmon Survey || MAS || align=right data-sort-value="0.89" | 890 m || 
|-id=617 bgcolor=#fefefe
| 361617 ||  || — || October 3, 2007 || Purple Mountain || PMO NEO || — || align=right | 1.3 km || 
|-id=618 bgcolor=#fefefe
| 361618 ||  || — || October 5, 2007 || Kitt Peak || Spacewatch || FLO || align=right data-sort-value="0.72" | 720 m || 
|-id=619 bgcolor=#E9E9E9
| 361619 ||  || — || October 7, 2007 || Catalina || CSS || — || align=right | 1.1 km || 
|-id=620 bgcolor=#fefefe
| 361620 ||  || — || October 8, 2007 || Mount Lemmon || Mount Lemmon Survey || CLA || align=right | 1.5 km || 
|-id=621 bgcolor=#fefefe
| 361621 ||  || — || October 8, 2007 || Mount Lemmon || Mount Lemmon Survey || V || align=right data-sort-value="0.77" | 770 m || 
|-id=622 bgcolor=#fefefe
| 361622 ||  || — || October 4, 2007 || Purple Mountain || PMO NEO || ERI || align=right | 2.3 km || 
|-id=623 bgcolor=#fefefe
| 361623 ||  || — || October 8, 2007 || Catalina || CSS || V || align=right data-sort-value="0.74" | 740 m || 
|-id=624 bgcolor=#fefefe
| 361624 ||  || — || October 8, 2007 || Catalina || CSS || — || align=right data-sort-value="0.98" | 980 m || 
|-id=625 bgcolor=#fefefe
| 361625 ||  || — || October 13, 2007 || Dauban || Chante-Perdrix Obs. || — || align=right | 1.3 km || 
|-id=626 bgcolor=#fefefe
| 361626 ||  || — || October 6, 2007 || Socorro || LINEAR || V || align=right data-sort-value="0.79" | 790 m || 
|-id=627 bgcolor=#fefefe
| 361627 ||  || — || October 7, 2007 || Socorro || LINEAR || — || align=right | 1.3 km || 
|-id=628 bgcolor=#fefefe
| 361628 ||  || — || October 9, 2007 || Socorro || LINEAR || — || align=right | 2.0 km || 
|-id=629 bgcolor=#fefefe
| 361629 ||  || — || October 11, 2007 || Socorro || LINEAR || — || align=right data-sort-value="0.92" | 920 m || 
|-id=630 bgcolor=#fefefe
| 361630 ||  || — || October 4, 2007 || Kitt Peak || Spacewatch || — || align=right data-sort-value="0.89" | 890 m || 
|-id=631 bgcolor=#E9E9E9
| 361631 ||  || — || October 5, 2007 || Kitt Peak || Spacewatch || — || align=right data-sort-value="0.91" | 910 m || 
|-id=632 bgcolor=#fefefe
| 361632 ||  || — || October 8, 2007 || Anderson Mesa || LONEOS || V || align=right data-sort-value="0.75" | 750 m || 
|-id=633 bgcolor=#fefefe
| 361633 ||  || — || October 8, 2007 || Anderson Mesa || LONEOS || — || align=right | 1.3 km || 
|-id=634 bgcolor=#fefefe
| 361634 ||  || — || October 13, 2007 || Socorro || LINEAR || V || align=right data-sort-value="0.83" | 830 m || 
|-id=635 bgcolor=#fefefe
| 361635 ||  || — || October 8, 2007 || Kitt Peak || Spacewatch || — || align=right data-sort-value="0.87" | 870 m || 
|-id=636 bgcolor=#E9E9E9
| 361636 ||  || — || October 7, 2007 || Kitt Peak || Spacewatch || — || align=right | 1.3 km || 
|-id=637 bgcolor=#fefefe
| 361637 ||  || — || October 7, 2007 || Kitt Peak || Spacewatch || NYS || align=right | 1.3 km || 
|-id=638 bgcolor=#fefefe
| 361638 ||  || — || September 10, 2007 || Mount Lemmon || Mount Lemmon Survey || — || align=right data-sort-value="0.86" | 860 m || 
|-id=639 bgcolor=#fefefe
| 361639 ||  || — || October 8, 2007 || Catalina || CSS || — || align=right | 1.8 km || 
|-id=640 bgcolor=#fefefe
| 361640 ||  || — || October 8, 2007 || Catalina || CSS || — || align=right | 1.2 km || 
|-id=641 bgcolor=#fefefe
| 361641 ||  || — || October 11, 2007 || Mount Lemmon || Mount Lemmon Survey || — || align=right data-sort-value="0.94" | 940 m || 
|-id=642 bgcolor=#fefefe
| 361642 ||  || — || October 10, 2007 || Kitt Peak || Spacewatch || — || align=right data-sort-value="0.82" | 820 m || 
|-id=643 bgcolor=#fefefe
| 361643 ||  || — || October 10, 2007 || Mount Lemmon || Mount Lemmon Survey || FLO || align=right data-sort-value="0.83" | 830 m || 
|-id=644 bgcolor=#fefefe
| 361644 ||  || — || October 12, 2007 || Kitt Peak || Spacewatch || — || align=right data-sort-value="0.75" | 750 m || 
|-id=645 bgcolor=#fefefe
| 361645 ||  || — || October 12, 2007 || Kitt Peak || Spacewatch || V || align=right data-sort-value="0.83" | 830 m || 
|-id=646 bgcolor=#E9E9E9
| 361646 ||  || — || October 12, 2007 || Anderson Mesa || LONEOS || — || align=right | 1.7 km || 
|-id=647 bgcolor=#E9E9E9
| 361647 ||  || — || October 12, 2007 || Kitt Peak || Spacewatch || — || align=right data-sort-value="0.86" | 860 m || 
|-id=648 bgcolor=#E9E9E9
| 361648 ||  || — || October 12, 2007 || Kitt Peak || Spacewatch || — || align=right data-sort-value="0.75" | 750 m || 
|-id=649 bgcolor=#E9E9E9
| 361649 ||  || — || September 14, 2007 || Mount Lemmon || Mount Lemmon Survey || — || align=right | 1.2 km || 
|-id=650 bgcolor=#fefefe
| 361650 ||  || — || October 13, 2007 || Catalina || CSS || — || align=right data-sort-value="0.86" | 860 m || 
|-id=651 bgcolor=#E9E9E9
| 361651 ||  || — || October 11, 2007 || Kitt Peak || Spacewatch || — || align=right data-sort-value="0.94" | 940 m || 
|-id=652 bgcolor=#E9E9E9
| 361652 ||  || — || October 11, 2007 || Kitt Peak || Spacewatch || — || align=right | 1.1 km || 
|-id=653 bgcolor=#E9E9E9
| 361653 ||  || — || October 11, 2007 || Kitt Peak || Spacewatch || fast? || align=right | 1.3 km || 
|-id=654 bgcolor=#fefefe
| 361654 ||  || — || October 13, 2007 || Lulin Observatory || LUSS || — || align=right data-sort-value="0.95" | 950 m || 
|-id=655 bgcolor=#fefefe
| 361655 ||  || — || October 13, 2007 || Lulin || LUSS || V || align=right data-sort-value="0.71" | 710 m || 
|-id=656 bgcolor=#E9E9E9
| 361656 ||  || — || October 8, 2007 || Mount Lemmon || Mount Lemmon Survey || — || align=right data-sort-value="0.96" | 960 m || 
|-id=657 bgcolor=#fefefe
| 361657 ||  || — || October 12, 2007 || Catalina || CSS || FLO || align=right data-sort-value="0.72" | 720 m || 
|-id=658 bgcolor=#fefefe
| 361658 ||  || — || October 12, 2007 || Kitt Peak || Spacewatch || V || align=right data-sort-value="0.85" | 850 m || 
|-id=659 bgcolor=#E9E9E9
| 361659 ||  || — || October 14, 2007 || Kitt Peak || Spacewatch || — || align=right | 1.0 km || 
|-id=660 bgcolor=#E9E9E9
| 361660 ||  || — || September 15, 2007 || Mount Lemmon || Mount Lemmon Survey || — || align=right | 1.2 km || 
|-id=661 bgcolor=#E9E9E9
| 361661 ||  || — || October 15, 2007 || Catalina || CSS || — || align=right | 1.0 km || 
|-id=662 bgcolor=#fefefe
| 361662 ||  || — || October 14, 2007 || Catalina || CSS || V || align=right data-sort-value="0.97" | 970 m || 
|-id=663 bgcolor=#fefefe
| 361663 ||  || — || October 15, 2007 || Kitt Peak || Spacewatch || — || align=right data-sort-value="0.96" | 960 m || 
|-id=664 bgcolor=#fefefe
| 361664 ||  || — || October 15, 2007 || Mount Lemmon || Mount Lemmon Survey || — || align=right data-sort-value="0.96" | 960 m || 
|-id=665 bgcolor=#fefefe
| 361665 ||  || — || October 13, 2007 || Catalina || CSS || NYS || align=right data-sort-value="0.85" | 850 m || 
|-id=666 bgcolor=#fefefe
| 361666 ||  || — || October 10, 2007 || Kitt Peak || Spacewatch || — || align=right data-sort-value="0.94" | 940 m || 
|-id=667 bgcolor=#fefefe
| 361667 ||  || — || October 12, 2007 || Kitt Peak || Spacewatch || FLO || align=right data-sort-value="0.65" | 650 m || 
|-id=668 bgcolor=#fefefe
| 361668 ||  || — || October 8, 2007 || Kitt Peak || Spacewatch || V || align=right data-sort-value="0.71" | 710 m || 
|-id=669 bgcolor=#fefefe
| 361669 ||  || — || October 12, 2007 || Mount Lemmon || Mount Lemmon Survey || — || align=right data-sort-value="0.93" | 930 m || 
|-id=670 bgcolor=#fefefe
| 361670 ||  || — || October 12, 2007 || Mount Lemmon || Mount Lemmon Survey || V || align=right data-sort-value="0.92" | 920 m || 
|-id=671 bgcolor=#fefefe
| 361671 ||  || — || October 13, 2007 || Socorro || LINEAR || FLO || align=right data-sort-value="0.91" | 910 m || 
|-id=672 bgcolor=#fefefe
| 361672 ||  || — || October 11, 2007 || Socorro || LINEAR || PHO || align=right | 1.4 km || 
|-id=673 bgcolor=#E9E9E9
| 361673 ||  || — || October 17, 2007 || Junk Bond || D. Healy || — || align=right data-sort-value="0.90" | 900 m || 
|-id=674 bgcolor=#E9E9E9
| 361674 ||  || — || October 16, 2007 || Andrushivka || Andrushivka Obs. || — || align=right | 1.6 km || 
|-id=675 bgcolor=#E9E9E9
| 361675 ||  || — || October 21, 2007 || La Sagra || OAM Obs. || — || align=right | 2.0 km || 
|-id=676 bgcolor=#fefefe
| 361676 ||  || — || October 19, 2007 || Catalina || CSS || V || align=right data-sort-value="0.89" | 890 m || 
|-id=677 bgcolor=#fefefe
| 361677 ||  || — || October 19, 2007 || Catalina || CSS || — || align=right data-sort-value="0.86" | 860 m || 
|-id=678 bgcolor=#E9E9E9
| 361678 ||  || — || October 9, 2007 || Catalina || CSS || BAR || align=right | 1.7 km || 
|-id=679 bgcolor=#fefefe
| 361679 ||  || — || October 19, 2007 || Kitt Peak || Spacewatch || NYS || align=right data-sort-value="0.77" | 770 m || 
|-id=680 bgcolor=#E9E9E9
| 361680 ||  || — || October 19, 2007 || Kitt Peak || Spacewatch || — || align=right data-sort-value="0.99" | 990 m || 
|-id=681 bgcolor=#fefefe
| 361681 ||  || — || October 20, 2007 || Catalina || CSS || — || align=right data-sort-value="0.87" | 870 m || 
|-id=682 bgcolor=#fefefe
| 361682 ||  || — || October 24, 2007 || Mount Lemmon || Mount Lemmon Survey || — || align=right | 1.3 km || 
|-id=683 bgcolor=#E9E9E9
| 361683 ||  || — || October 30, 2007 || Mount Lemmon || Mount Lemmon Survey || JUN || align=right data-sort-value="0.84" | 840 m || 
|-id=684 bgcolor=#E9E9E9
| 361684 ||  || — || October 7, 2007 || Kitt Peak || Spacewatch || — || align=right | 1.4 km || 
|-id=685 bgcolor=#fefefe
| 361685 ||  || — || October 31, 2007 || Kitt Peak || Spacewatch || — || align=right | 1.2 km || 
|-id=686 bgcolor=#E9E9E9
| 361686 ||  || — || October 31, 2007 || Kitt Peak || Spacewatch || — || align=right | 1.4 km || 
|-id=687 bgcolor=#fefefe
| 361687 ||  || — || October 24, 2007 || Mount Lemmon || Mount Lemmon Survey || V || align=right data-sort-value="0.68" | 680 m || 
|-id=688 bgcolor=#fefefe
| 361688 ||  || — || October 24, 2007 || Mount Lemmon || Mount Lemmon Survey || — || align=right data-sort-value="0.99" | 990 m || 
|-id=689 bgcolor=#FFC2E0
| 361689 ||  || — || November 4, 2007 || Catalina || CSS || APOcritical || align=right data-sort-value="0.49" | 490 m || 
|-id=690 bgcolor=#fefefe
| 361690 Laurelanmaurer ||  ||  || November 5, 2007 || Wiggins Observatory || P. Wiggins || NYS || align=right data-sort-value="0.80" | 800 m || 
|-id=691 bgcolor=#fefefe
| 361691 ||  || — || November 1, 2007 || Kitt Peak || Spacewatch || V || align=right data-sort-value="0.70" | 700 m || 
|-id=692 bgcolor=#E9E9E9
| 361692 ||  || — || November 1, 2007 || Kitt Peak || Spacewatch || — || align=right | 1.0 km || 
|-id=693 bgcolor=#E9E9E9
| 361693 ||  || — || November 2, 2007 || Kitt Peak || Spacewatch || — || align=right data-sort-value="0.87" | 870 m || 
|-id=694 bgcolor=#E9E9E9
| 361694 ||  || — || November 2, 2007 || Kitt Peak || Spacewatch || — || align=right | 2.8 km || 
|-id=695 bgcolor=#fefefe
| 361695 ||  || — || November 3, 2007 || Kitt Peak || Spacewatch || MAS || align=right data-sort-value="0.94" | 940 m || 
|-id=696 bgcolor=#E9E9E9
| 361696 ||  || — || November 5, 2007 || Purple Mountain || PMO NEO || — || align=right | 1.1 km || 
|-id=697 bgcolor=#fefefe
| 361697 ||  || — || November 4, 2007 || Kitt Peak || Spacewatch || — || align=right data-sort-value="0.88" | 880 m || 
|-id=698 bgcolor=#E9E9E9
| 361698 ||  || — || November 5, 2007 || Kitt Peak || Spacewatch || — || align=right | 1.1 km || 
|-id=699 bgcolor=#fefefe
| 361699 ||  || — || November 5, 2007 || Kitt Peak || Spacewatch || V || align=right data-sort-value="0.76" | 760 m || 
|-id=700 bgcolor=#fefefe
| 361700 ||  || — || November 5, 2007 || Kitt Peak || Spacewatch || ERI || align=right | 1.9 km || 
|}

361701–361800 

|-bgcolor=#E9E9E9
| 361701 ||  || — || November 24, 2003 || Kitt Peak || DES || — || align=right | 1.3 km || 
|-id=702 bgcolor=#fefefe
| 361702 ||  || — || November 7, 2007 || Mount Lemmon || Mount Lemmon Survey || — || align=right | 1.6 km || 
|-id=703 bgcolor=#fefefe
| 361703 ||  || — || November 7, 2007 || Mount Lemmon || Mount Lemmon Survey || FLO || align=right data-sort-value="0.61" | 610 m || 
|-id=704 bgcolor=#fefefe
| 361704 ||  || — || November 9, 2007 || Catalina || CSS || V || align=right data-sort-value="0.98" | 980 m || 
|-id=705 bgcolor=#E9E9E9
| 361705 ||  || — || November 14, 2007 || Bisei SG Center || BATTeRS || — || align=right | 1.1 km || 
|-id=706 bgcolor=#fefefe
| 361706 ||  || — || November 9, 2007 || Catalina || CSS || V || align=right data-sort-value="0.83" | 830 m || 
|-id=707 bgcolor=#E9E9E9
| 361707 ||  || — || November 10, 2007 || Purple Mountain || PMO NEO || — || align=right | 1.8 km || 
|-id=708 bgcolor=#fefefe
| 361708 ||  || — || November 15, 2007 || Mount Lemmon || Mount Lemmon Survey || V || align=right data-sort-value="0.75" | 750 m || 
|-id=709 bgcolor=#E9E9E9
| 361709 ||  || — || September 15, 2007 || Mount Lemmon || Mount Lemmon Survey || — || align=right | 1.0 km || 
|-id=710 bgcolor=#E9E9E9
| 361710 ||  || — || November 14, 2007 || Kitt Peak || Spacewatch || — || align=right | 1.1 km || 
|-id=711 bgcolor=#fefefe
| 361711 ||  || — || November 15, 2007 || Anderson Mesa || LONEOS || — || align=right | 1.1 km || 
|-id=712 bgcolor=#E9E9E9
| 361712 ||  || — || November 5, 2007 || XuYi || PMO NEO || JUN || align=right | 1.0 km || 
|-id=713 bgcolor=#fefefe
| 361713 ||  || — || September 12, 2007 || Catalina || CSS || — || align=right | 1.4 km || 
|-id=714 bgcolor=#fefefe
| 361714 ||  || — || November 3, 2007 || Kitt Peak || Spacewatch || V || align=right data-sort-value="0.93" | 930 m || 
|-id=715 bgcolor=#fefefe
| 361715 ||  || — || November 9, 2007 || Kitt Peak || Spacewatch || NYS || align=right data-sort-value="0.86" | 860 m || 
|-id=716 bgcolor=#E9E9E9
| 361716 ||  || — || December 18, 2003 || Socorro || LINEAR || EUN || align=right | 1.5 km || 
|-id=717 bgcolor=#fefefe
| 361717 ||  || — || November 2, 2007 || Socorro || LINEAR || — || align=right | 1.1 km || 
|-id=718 bgcolor=#fefefe
| 361718 ||  || — || November 5, 2007 || Socorro || LINEAR || MAS || align=right data-sort-value="0.83" | 830 m || 
|-id=719 bgcolor=#E9E9E9
| 361719 ||  || — || November 14, 2007 || Kitt Peak || Spacewatch || — || align=right data-sort-value="0.88" | 880 m || 
|-id=720 bgcolor=#fefefe
| 361720 ||  || — || November 14, 2007 || Kitt Peak || Spacewatch || — || align=right data-sort-value="0.94" | 940 m || 
|-id=721 bgcolor=#fefefe
| 361721 ||  || — || November 17, 2007 || Mount Lemmon || Mount Lemmon Survey || V || align=right data-sort-value="0.79" | 790 m || 
|-id=722 bgcolor=#fefefe
| 361722 ||  || — || November 18, 2007 || Mount Lemmon || Mount Lemmon Survey || — || align=right data-sort-value="0.79" | 790 m || 
|-id=723 bgcolor=#E9E9E9
| 361723 ||  || — || November 3, 2007 || Kitt Peak || Spacewatch || — || align=right | 1.1 km || 
|-id=724 bgcolor=#E9E9E9
| 361724 ||  || — || November 19, 2007 || Kitt Peak || Spacewatch || — || align=right | 1.0 km || 
|-id=725 bgcolor=#E9E9E9
| 361725 ||  || — || November 19, 2007 || Mount Lemmon || Mount Lemmon Survey || — || align=right | 1.2 km || 
|-id=726 bgcolor=#E9E9E9
| 361726 ||  || — || November 19, 2007 || Mount Lemmon || Mount Lemmon Survey || — || align=right data-sort-value="0.90" | 900 m || 
|-id=727 bgcolor=#fefefe
| 361727 ||  || — || November 20, 2007 || Mount Lemmon || Mount Lemmon Survey || — || align=right | 2.2 km || 
|-id=728 bgcolor=#fefefe
| 361728 ||  || — || November 20, 2007 || Mount Lemmon || Mount Lemmon Survey || — || align=right | 1.2 km || 
|-id=729 bgcolor=#E9E9E9
| 361729 ||  || — || November 17, 2007 || Catalina || CSS || — || align=right | 1.3 km || 
|-id=730 bgcolor=#E9E9E9
| 361730 ||  || — || November 29, 2007 || Lulin || LUSS || BAR || align=right | 1.6 km || 
|-id=731 bgcolor=#E9E9E9
| 361731 ||  || — || November 18, 2007 || Socorro || LINEAR || — || align=right | 1.3 km || 
|-id=732 bgcolor=#fefefe
| 361732 ||  || — || November 19, 2003 || Kitt Peak || Spacewatch || — || align=right data-sort-value="0.80" | 800 m || 
|-id=733 bgcolor=#E9E9E9
| 361733 ||  || — || October 20, 2007 || Mount Lemmon || Mount Lemmon Survey || — || align=right | 1.1 km || 
|-id=734 bgcolor=#E9E9E9
| 361734 ||  || — || December 5, 2007 || Pla D'Arguines || R. Ferrando || — || align=right | 1.4 km || 
|-id=735 bgcolor=#E9E9E9
| 361735 ||  || — || October 19, 2007 || Catalina || CSS || — || align=right | 1.2 km || 
|-id=736 bgcolor=#fefefe
| 361736 ||  || — || December 4, 2007 || Kitt Peak || Spacewatch || V || align=right data-sort-value="0.76" | 760 m || 
|-id=737 bgcolor=#E9E9E9
| 361737 ||  || — || December 5, 2007 || Mount Lemmon || Mount Lemmon Survey || — || align=right data-sort-value="0.95" | 950 m || 
|-id=738 bgcolor=#fefefe
| 361738 ||  || — || December 10, 2007 || Socorro || LINEAR || — || align=right | 1.3 km || 
|-id=739 bgcolor=#E9E9E9
| 361739 ||  || — || September 15, 2007 || Mount Lemmon || Mount Lemmon Survey || — || align=right | 1.4 km || 
|-id=740 bgcolor=#E9E9E9
| 361740 ||  || — || December 10, 2007 || Socorro || LINEAR || — || align=right | 1.5 km || 
|-id=741 bgcolor=#E9E9E9
| 361741 ||  || — || September 15, 2007 || Mount Lemmon || Mount Lemmon Survey || — || align=right data-sort-value="0.98" | 980 m || 
|-id=742 bgcolor=#E9E9E9
| 361742 ||  || — || November 5, 2007 || Kitt Peak || Spacewatch || — || align=right data-sort-value="0.98" | 980 m || 
|-id=743 bgcolor=#E9E9E9
| 361743 ||  || — || December 9, 2007 || Nyukasa || Mount Nyukasa Stn. || — || align=right | 1.5 km || 
|-id=744 bgcolor=#E9E9E9
| 361744 ||  || — || December 13, 2007 || Socorro || LINEAR || — || align=right | 1.0 km || 
|-id=745 bgcolor=#E9E9E9
| 361745 ||  || — || December 13, 2007 || Socorro || LINEAR || — || align=right | 2.8 km || 
|-id=746 bgcolor=#fefefe
| 361746 ||  || — || December 14, 2007 || Socorro || LINEAR || V || align=right data-sort-value="0.98" | 980 m || 
|-id=747 bgcolor=#E9E9E9
| 361747 ||  || — || December 6, 2007 || Catalina || CSS || — || align=right | 2.0 km || 
|-id=748 bgcolor=#E9E9E9
| 361748 ||  || — || December 6, 2007 || Mount Lemmon || Mount Lemmon Survey || — || align=right | 1.2 km || 
|-id=749 bgcolor=#E9E9E9
| 361749 ||  || — || December 14, 2007 || Mount Lemmon || Mount Lemmon Survey || ADE || align=right | 3.8 km || 
|-id=750 bgcolor=#fefefe
| 361750 ||  || — || September 28, 2003 || Socorro || LINEAR || — || align=right | 1.00 km || 
|-id=751 bgcolor=#E9E9E9
| 361751 ||  || — || December 3, 2007 || Kitt Peak || Spacewatch || — || align=right | 1.9 km || 
|-id=752 bgcolor=#E9E9E9
| 361752 ||  || — || December 19, 2007 || Piszkéstető || K. Sárneczky || — || align=right | 2.4 km || 
|-id=753 bgcolor=#E9E9E9
| 361753 ||  || — || December 4, 2007 || Mount Lemmon || Mount Lemmon Survey || — || align=right | 1.0 km || 
|-id=754 bgcolor=#FFC2E0
| 361754 ||  || — || December 28, 2007 || Socorro || LINEAR || APOPHA || align=right data-sort-value="0.54" | 540 m || 
|-id=755 bgcolor=#E9E9E9
| 361755 ||  || — || October 19, 1998 || Kitt Peak || Spacewatch || — || align=right | 1.4 km || 
|-id=756 bgcolor=#d6d6d6
| 361756 ||  || — || December 30, 2007 || Catalina || CSS || — || align=right | 4.3 km || 
|-id=757 bgcolor=#E9E9E9
| 361757 ||  || — || December 16, 2007 || Catalina || CSS || — || align=right | 1.9 km || 
|-id=758 bgcolor=#E9E9E9
| 361758 ||  || — || December 18, 2007 || Mount Lemmon || Mount Lemmon Survey || — || align=right | 1.5 km || 
|-id=759 bgcolor=#E9E9E9
| 361759 ||  || — || December 31, 2007 || Kitt Peak || Spacewatch || — || align=right | 1.6 km || 
|-id=760 bgcolor=#E9E9E9
| 361760 ||  || — || December 16, 2007 || Catalina || CSS || — || align=right | 1.3 km || 
|-id=761 bgcolor=#E9E9E9
| 361761 ||  || — || December 30, 2007 || Kitt Peak || Spacewatch || — || align=right | 1.8 km || 
|-id=762 bgcolor=#fefefe
| 361762 ||  || — || December 17, 2007 || Mount Lemmon || Mount Lemmon Survey || — || align=right | 1.3 km || 
|-id=763 bgcolor=#E9E9E9
| 361763 ||  || — || December 30, 2007 || Kitt Peak || Spacewatch || — || align=right | 1.4 km || 
|-id=764 bgcolor=#fefefe
| 361764 Antonbuslov ||  ||  || January 6, 2008 || Zelenchukskaya || Zelenchukskaya Stn. || H || align=right data-sort-value="0.83" | 830 m || 
|-id=765 bgcolor=#E9E9E9
| 361765 ||  || — || January 9, 2008 || Lulin || LUSS || — || align=right | 2.8 km || 
|-id=766 bgcolor=#fefefe
| 361766 ||  || — || January 10, 2008 || Mount Lemmon || Mount Lemmon Survey || SUL || align=right | 2.4 km || 
|-id=767 bgcolor=#E9E9E9
| 361767 ||  || — || January 10, 2008 || Kitt Peak || Spacewatch || — || align=right | 1.4 km || 
|-id=768 bgcolor=#E9E9E9
| 361768 ||  || — || January 10, 2008 || Mount Lemmon || Mount Lemmon Survey || — || align=right | 1.8 km || 
|-id=769 bgcolor=#E9E9E9
| 361769 ||  || — || January 10, 2008 || Kitt Peak || Spacewatch || — || align=right | 1.4 km || 
|-id=770 bgcolor=#E9E9E9
| 361770 ||  || — || January 10, 2008 || Mount Lemmon || Mount Lemmon Survey || NEM || align=right | 2.8 km || 
|-id=771 bgcolor=#E9E9E9
| 361771 ||  || — || December 14, 2007 || Mount Lemmon || Mount Lemmon Survey || CLO || align=right | 2.3 km || 
|-id=772 bgcolor=#E9E9E9
| 361772 ||  || — || January 10, 2008 || Altschwendt || W. Ries || — || align=right | 1.6 km || 
|-id=773 bgcolor=#E9E9E9
| 361773 ||  || — || January 10, 2008 || Kitt Peak || Spacewatch || — || align=right | 1.6 km || 
|-id=774 bgcolor=#E9E9E9
| 361774 ||  || — || January 10, 2008 || Mount Lemmon || Mount Lemmon Survey || — || align=right | 2.0 km || 
|-id=775 bgcolor=#E9E9E9
| 361775 ||  || — || January 10, 2008 || Mount Lemmon || Mount Lemmon Survey || PAD || align=right | 1.7 km || 
|-id=776 bgcolor=#E9E9E9
| 361776 ||  || — || January 11, 2008 || Kitt Peak || Spacewatch || — || align=right | 2.1 km || 
|-id=777 bgcolor=#E9E9E9
| 361777 ||  || — || January 11, 2008 || Kitt Peak || Spacewatch || — || align=right | 1.6 km || 
|-id=778 bgcolor=#d6d6d6
| 361778 ||  || — || January 11, 2008 || Mount Lemmon || Mount Lemmon Survey || — || align=right | 2.5 km || 
|-id=779 bgcolor=#E9E9E9
| 361779 ||  || — || December 31, 2007 || Kitt Peak || Spacewatch || — || align=right | 1.3 km || 
|-id=780 bgcolor=#E9E9E9
| 361780 ||  || — || January 11, 2008 || Catalina || CSS || DOR || align=right | 2.0 km || 
|-id=781 bgcolor=#E9E9E9
| 361781 ||  || — || January 12, 2008 || Mount Lemmon || Mount Lemmon Survey || — || align=right | 1.4 km || 
|-id=782 bgcolor=#E9E9E9
| 361782 ||  || — || January 13, 2008 || Kitt Peak || Spacewatch || — || align=right | 1.5 km || 
|-id=783 bgcolor=#E9E9E9
| 361783 ||  || — || January 13, 2008 || Kitt Peak || Spacewatch || — || align=right | 1.8 km || 
|-id=784 bgcolor=#E9E9E9
| 361784 ||  || — || January 14, 2008 || Kitt Peak || Spacewatch || NEM || align=right | 2.0 km || 
|-id=785 bgcolor=#E9E9E9
| 361785 ||  || — || January 14, 2008 || Kitt Peak || Spacewatch || NEM || align=right | 2.4 km || 
|-id=786 bgcolor=#E9E9E9
| 361786 ||  || — || January 13, 2008 || Kitt Peak || Spacewatch || — || align=right | 1.7 km || 
|-id=787 bgcolor=#E9E9E9
| 361787 ||  || — || January 5, 2008 || Purple Mountain || PMO NEO || — || align=right | 2.2 km || 
|-id=788 bgcolor=#E9E9E9
| 361788 ||  || — || January 11, 2008 || Socorro || LINEAR || — || align=right | 3.0 km || 
|-id=789 bgcolor=#E9E9E9
| 361789 ||  || — || January 16, 2008 || Kitt Peak || Spacewatch || — || align=right | 3.2 km || 
|-id=790 bgcolor=#E9E9E9
| 361790 ||  || — || January 16, 2008 || Kitt Peak || Spacewatch || — || align=right | 1.4 km || 
|-id=791 bgcolor=#E9E9E9
| 361791 ||  || — || January 30, 2008 || Mount Lemmon || Mount Lemmon Survey || — || align=right | 2.0 km || 
|-id=792 bgcolor=#E9E9E9
| 361792 ||  || — || January 31, 2008 || Mount Lemmon || Mount Lemmon Survey || — || align=right | 3.1 km || 
|-id=793 bgcolor=#E9E9E9
| 361793 ||  || — || January 30, 2008 || Catalina || CSS || — || align=right | 1.7 km || 
|-id=794 bgcolor=#E9E9E9
| 361794 ||  || — || January 30, 2008 || Mount Lemmon || Mount Lemmon Survey || — || align=right | 2.9 km || 
|-id=795 bgcolor=#E9E9E9
| 361795 ||  || — || January 18, 2008 || Kitt Peak || Spacewatch || WIT || align=right data-sort-value="0.94" | 940 m || 
|-id=796 bgcolor=#d6d6d6
| 361796 ||  || — || January 30, 2008 || Mount Lemmon || Mount Lemmon Survey || — || align=right | 3.8 km || 
|-id=797 bgcolor=#E9E9E9
| 361797 ||  || — || January 31, 2008 || Mount Lemmon || Mount Lemmon Survey || — || align=right | 2.1 km || 
|-id=798 bgcolor=#E9E9E9
| 361798 ||  || — || February 3, 2008 || Kitt Peak || Spacewatch || MRX || align=right | 1.2 km || 
|-id=799 bgcolor=#E9E9E9
| 361799 ||  || — || February 3, 2008 || Kitt Peak || Spacewatch || — || align=right | 2.9 km || 
|-id=800 bgcolor=#E9E9E9
| 361800 ||  || — || December 14, 2007 || Mount Lemmon || Mount Lemmon Survey || — || align=right | 2.1 km || 
|}

361801–361900 

|-bgcolor=#E9E9E9
| 361801 ||  || — || February 2, 2008 || Mount Lemmon || Mount Lemmon Survey || HOF || align=right | 2.6 km || 
|-id=802 bgcolor=#E9E9E9
| 361802 ||  || — || February 4, 2008 || La Sagra || OAM Obs. || ADE || align=right | 2.4 km || 
|-id=803 bgcolor=#E9E9E9
| 361803 ||  || — || February 1, 2008 || Kitt Peak || Spacewatch || HOF || align=right | 3.0 km || 
|-id=804 bgcolor=#E9E9E9
| 361804 ||  || — || February 1, 2008 || Kitt Peak || Spacewatch || — || align=right | 2.6 km || 
|-id=805 bgcolor=#E9E9E9
| 361805 ||  || — || March 30, 2004 || Kitt Peak || Spacewatch || — || align=right | 2.4 km || 
|-id=806 bgcolor=#E9E9E9
| 361806 ||  || — || February 2, 2008 || Kitt Peak || Spacewatch || — || align=right | 2.2 km || 
|-id=807 bgcolor=#E9E9E9
| 361807 ||  || — || February 2, 2008 || Kitt Peak || Spacewatch || — || align=right | 2.0 km || 
|-id=808 bgcolor=#E9E9E9
| 361808 ||  || — || February 2, 2008 || Mount Lemmon || Mount Lemmon Survey || WIT || align=right | 1.1 km || 
|-id=809 bgcolor=#FA8072
| 361809 ||  || — || February 3, 2008 || Catalina || CSS || — || align=right | 2.4 km || 
|-id=810 bgcolor=#E9E9E9
| 361810 ||  || — || February 6, 2008 || Catalina || CSS || GEF || align=right | 1.5 km || 
|-id=811 bgcolor=#E9E9E9
| 361811 ||  || — || February 7, 2008 || Kitt Peak || Spacewatch || NEM || align=right | 2.0 km || 
|-id=812 bgcolor=#E9E9E9
| 361812 ||  || — || February 7, 2008 || Mount Lemmon || Mount Lemmon Survey || AGN || align=right data-sort-value="0.99" | 990 m || 
|-id=813 bgcolor=#E9E9E9
| 361813 ||  || — || February 6, 2008 || Catalina || CSS || — || align=right | 2.1 km || 
|-id=814 bgcolor=#E9E9E9
| 361814 ||  || — || February 6, 2008 || Catalina || CSS || — || align=right | 2.7 km || 
|-id=815 bgcolor=#E9E9E9
| 361815 ||  || — || February 6, 2008 || Catalina || CSS || — || align=right | 2.7 km || 
|-id=816 bgcolor=#E9E9E9
| 361816 ||  || — || January 13, 2008 || Catalina || CSS || JUN || align=right | 1.3 km || 
|-id=817 bgcolor=#E9E9E9
| 361817 ||  || — || February 8, 2008 || Mount Lemmon || Mount Lemmon Survey || AEO || align=right | 1.3 km || 
|-id=818 bgcolor=#E9E9E9
| 361818 ||  || — || February 9, 2008 || Mount Lemmon || Mount Lemmon Survey || — || align=right | 1.2 km || 
|-id=819 bgcolor=#d6d6d6
| 361819 ||  || — || February 9, 2008 || Mount Lemmon || Mount Lemmon Survey || CHA || align=right | 2.1 km || 
|-id=820 bgcolor=#E9E9E9
| 361820 ||  || — || January 30, 2008 || Vail-Jarnac || Jarnac Obs. || — || align=right | 3.3 km || 
|-id=821 bgcolor=#E9E9E9
| 361821 ||  || — || February 8, 2008 || Kitt Peak || Spacewatch || — || align=right | 1.9 km || 
|-id=822 bgcolor=#E9E9E9
| 361822 ||  || — || February 8, 2008 || Mount Lemmon || Mount Lemmon Survey || WIT || align=right | 1.3 km || 
|-id=823 bgcolor=#E9E9E9
| 361823 ||  || — || February 9, 2008 || Kitt Peak || Spacewatch || AER || align=right | 1.5 km || 
|-id=824 bgcolor=#d6d6d6
| 361824 ||  || — || February 9, 2008 || Kitt Peak || Spacewatch || — || align=right | 2.2 km || 
|-id=825 bgcolor=#E9E9E9
| 361825 ||  || — || February 10, 2008 || Mount Lemmon || Mount Lemmon Survey || — || align=right | 2.4 km || 
|-id=826 bgcolor=#E9E9E9
| 361826 ||  || — || February 10, 2008 || Socorro || LINEAR || — || align=right | 1.9 km || 
|-id=827 bgcolor=#E9E9E9
| 361827 ||  || — || February 6, 2008 || Catalina || CSS || — || align=right | 3.1 km || 
|-id=828 bgcolor=#E9E9E9
| 361828 ||  || — || February 6, 2008 || Catalina || CSS || — || align=right | 3.1 km || 
|-id=829 bgcolor=#E9E9E9
| 361829 ||  || — || February 3, 2008 || Catalina || CSS || DOR || align=right | 2.4 km || 
|-id=830 bgcolor=#E9E9E9
| 361830 ||  || — || February 11, 2008 || Mount Lemmon || Mount Lemmon Survey || — || align=right | 2.7 km || 
|-id=831 bgcolor=#E9E9E9
| 361831 ||  || — || February 8, 2008 || Kitt Peak || Spacewatch || — || align=right | 2.5 km || 
|-id=832 bgcolor=#E9E9E9
| 361832 ||  || — || February 10, 2008 || Kitt Peak || Spacewatch || AGN || align=right | 1.00 km || 
|-id=833 bgcolor=#E9E9E9
| 361833 ||  || — || February 8, 2008 || Socorro || LINEAR || — || align=right | 2.0 km || 
|-id=834 bgcolor=#E9E9E9
| 361834 ||  || — || February 27, 2008 || Bisei SG Center || BATTeRS || HNA || align=right | 2.6 km || 
|-id=835 bgcolor=#E9E9E9
| 361835 ||  || — || February 24, 2008 || Mount Lemmon || Mount Lemmon Survey || — || align=right | 1.8 km || 
|-id=836 bgcolor=#E9E9E9
| 361836 ||  || — || February 26, 2008 || Kitt Peak || Spacewatch || — || align=right | 2.7 km || 
|-id=837 bgcolor=#E9E9E9
| 361837 ||  || — || February 26, 2008 || Kitt Peak || Spacewatch || — || align=right | 2.8 km || 
|-id=838 bgcolor=#E9E9E9
| 361838 ||  || — || February 26, 2008 || Mount Lemmon || Mount Lemmon Survey || — || align=right | 2.5 km || 
|-id=839 bgcolor=#E9E9E9
| 361839 ||  || — || February 27, 2008 || Kitt Peak || Spacewatch || — || align=right | 1.6 km || 
|-id=840 bgcolor=#d6d6d6
| 361840 ||  || — || February 27, 2008 || Mount Lemmon || Mount Lemmon Survey || BRA || align=right | 2.0 km || 
|-id=841 bgcolor=#E9E9E9
| 361841 ||  || — || February 27, 2008 || Kitt Peak || Spacewatch || WIT || align=right | 1.2 km || 
|-id=842 bgcolor=#E9E9E9
| 361842 ||  || — || February 27, 2008 || Mount Lemmon || Mount Lemmon Survey || INO || align=right | 1.2 km || 
|-id=843 bgcolor=#E9E9E9
| 361843 ||  || — || February 28, 2008 || Mount Lemmon || Mount Lemmon Survey || — || align=right | 2.4 km || 
|-id=844 bgcolor=#d6d6d6
| 361844 ||  || — || February 28, 2008 || Kitt Peak || Spacewatch || — || align=right | 2.7 km || 
|-id=845 bgcolor=#d6d6d6
| 361845 ||  || — || February 28, 2008 || Kitt Peak || Spacewatch || — || align=right | 2.6 km || 
|-id=846 bgcolor=#E9E9E9
| 361846 ||  || — || February 29, 2008 || Mount Lemmon || Mount Lemmon Survey || GER || align=right | 1.7 km || 
|-id=847 bgcolor=#E9E9E9
| 361847 ||  || — || February 28, 2008 || Mount Lemmon || Mount Lemmon Survey || — || align=right | 1.5 km || 
|-id=848 bgcolor=#E9E9E9
| 361848 ||  || — || February 28, 2008 || Mount Lemmon || Mount Lemmon Survey || — || align=right | 2.2 km || 
|-id=849 bgcolor=#d6d6d6
| 361849 ||  || — || February 28, 2008 || Kitt Peak || Spacewatch || — || align=right | 2.0 km || 
|-id=850 bgcolor=#d6d6d6
| 361850 ||  || — || February 13, 2008 || Catalina || CSS || — || align=right | 3.0 km || 
|-id=851 bgcolor=#E9E9E9
| 361851 ||  || — || February 28, 2008 || Mount Lemmon || Mount Lemmon Survey || HOF || align=right | 2.7 km || 
|-id=852 bgcolor=#E9E9E9
| 361852 ||  || — || February 28, 2008 || Mount Lemmon || Mount Lemmon Survey || — || align=right | 2.3 km || 
|-id=853 bgcolor=#d6d6d6
| 361853 ||  || — || February 28, 2008 || Kitt Peak || Spacewatch || — || align=right | 2.9 km || 
|-id=854 bgcolor=#E9E9E9
| 361854 ||  || — || February 18, 2008 || Mount Lemmon || Mount Lemmon Survey || MRX || align=right | 1.3 km || 
|-id=855 bgcolor=#E9E9E9
| 361855 ||  || — || March 1, 2008 || Kitt Peak || Spacewatch || — || align=right | 2.8 km || 
|-id=856 bgcolor=#d6d6d6
| 361856 ||  || — || March 1, 2008 || Kitt Peak || Spacewatch || CHA || align=right | 2.6 km || 
|-id=857 bgcolor=#d6d6d6
| 361857 ||  || — || March 3, 2008 || Catalina || CSS || — || align=right | 2.8 km || 
|-id=858 bgcolor=#d6d6d6
| 361858 ||  || — || March 5, 2008 || Mount Lemmon || Mount Lemmon Survey || URS || align=right | 3.5 km || 
|-id=859 bgcolor=#E9E9E9
| 361859 ||  || — || March 7, 2008 || Mount Lemmon || Mount Lemmon Survey || — || align=right | 1.7 km || 
|-id=860 bgcolor=#E9E9E9
| 361860 ||  || — || March 8, 2008 || Catalina || CSS || — || align=right | 3.1 km || 
|-id=861 bgcolor=#FFC2E0
| 361861 ||  || — || March 11, 2008 || Catalina || CSS || APO +1km || align=right | 1.4 km || 
|-id=862 bgcolor=#E9E9E9
| 361862 ||  || — || February 9, 2008 || Kitt Peak || Spacewatch || — || align=right | 2.5 km || 
|-id=863 bgcolor=#FA8072
| 361863 ||  || — || March 7, 2008 || Mount Lemmon || Mount Lemmon Survey || H || align=right data-sort-value="0.52" | 520 m || 
|-id=864 bgcolor=#E9E9E9
| 361864 ||  || — || March 7, 2008 || Kitt Peak || Spacewatch || GEF || align=right | 1.4 km || 
|-id=865 bgcolor=#E9E9E9
| 361865 ||  || — || February 11, 2008 || Kitt Peak || Spacewatch || — || align=right | 3.5 km || 
|-id=866 bgcolor=#E9E9E9
| 361866 ||  || — || March 7, 2008 || Mount Lemmon || Mount Lemmon Survey || — || align=right | 2.5 km || 
|-id=867 bgcolor=#d6d6d6
| 361867 ||  || — || March 10, 2008 || Kitt Peak || Spacewatch || — || align=right | 3.2 km || 
|-id=868 bgcolor=#E9E9E9
| 361868 ||  || — || March 2, 2008 || Kitt Peak || Spacewatch || GEF || align=right | 1.1 km || 
|-id=869 bgcolor=#E9E9E9
| 361869 ||  || — || March 7, 2008 || Catalina || CSS || — || align=right | 3.1 km || 
|-id=870 bgcolor=#d6d6d6
| 361870 ||  || — || March 26, 2008 || Kitt Peak || Spacewatch || KOR || align=right | 1.4 km || 
|-id=871 bgcolor=#E9E9E9
| 361871 ||  || — || March 26, 2008 || Mount Lemmon || Mount Lemmon Survey || — || align=right | 1.7 km || 
|-id=872 bgcolor=#d6d6d6
| 361872 ||  || — || March 26, 2008 || Mount Lemmon || Mount Lemmon Survey || — || align=right | 2.5 km || 
|-id=873 bgcolor=#E9E9E9
| 361873 ||  || — || March 27, 2008 || Kitt Peak || Spacewatch || — || align=right | 2.5 km || 
|-id=874 bgcolor=#d6d6d6
| 361874 ||  || — || February 26, 2008 || Kitt Peak || Spacewatch || 628 || align=right | 2.0 km || 
|-id=875 bgcolor=#d6d6d6
| 361875 ||  || — || March 27, 2008 || Kitt Peak || Spacewatch || 628 || align=right | 1.6 km || 
|-id=876 bgcolor=#fefefe
| 361876 ||  || — || March 28, 2008 || Kitt Peak || Spacewatch || H || align=right data-sort-value="0.62" | 620 m || 
|-id=877 bgcolor=#d6d6d6
| 361877 ||  || — || March 28, 2008 || Mount Lemmon || Mount Lemmon Survey || — || align=right | 2.5 km || 
|-id=878 bgcolor=#d6d6d6
| 361878 ||  || — || March 28, 2008 || Mount Lemmon || Mount Lemmon Survey || — || align=right | 2.7 km || 
|-id=879 bgcolor=#d6d6d6
| 361879 ||  || — || February 28, 2008 || Mount Lemmon || Mount Lemmon Survey || — || align=right | 3.2 km || 
|-id=880 bgcolor=#d6d6d6
| 361880 ||  || — || March 28, 2008 || Mount Lemmon || Mount Lemmon Survey || — || align=right | 2.8 km || 
|-id=881 bgcolor=#d6d6d6
| 361881 ||  || — || April 25, 2003 || Campo Imperatore || CINEOS || — || align=right | 2.4 km || 
|-id=882 bgcolor=#d6d6d6
| 361882 ||  || — || March 28, 2008 || Kitt Peak || Spacewatch || — || align=right | 3.3 km || 
|-id=883 bgcolor=#d6d6d6
| 361883 ||  || — || March 28, 2008 || Kitt Peak || Spacewatch || — || align=right | 3.7 km || 
|-id=884 bgcolor=#d6d6d6
| 361884 ||  || — || March 28, 2008 || Kitt Peak || Spacewatch || URS || align=right | 3.2 km || 
|-id=885 bgcolor=#d6d6d6
| 361885 ||  || — || December 11, 2006 || Kitt Peak || Spacewatch || — || align=right | 2.8 km || 
|-id=886 bgcolor=#d6d6d6
| 361886 ||  || — || March 27, 2008 || Mount Lemmon || Mount Lemmon Survey || — || align=right | 2.2 km || 
|-id=887 bgcolor=#d6d6d6
| 361887 ||  || — || September 13, 2005 || Kitt Peak || Spacewatch || — || align=right | 2.8 km || 
|-id=888 bgcolor=#E9E9E9
| 361888 ||  || — || January 13, 2008 || Kitt Peak || Spacewatch || — || align=right | 2.3 km || 
|-id=889 bgcolor=#E9E9E9
| 361889 ||  || — || February 11, 2008 || Kitt Peak || Spacewatch || — || align=right | 2.4 km || 
|-id=890 bgcolor=#d6d6d6
| 361890 ||  || — || March 29, 2008 || Kitt Peak || Spacewatch || CHA || align=right | 2.0 km || 
|-id=891 bgcolor=#d6d6d6
| 361891 ||  || — || March 30, 2008 || Kitt Peak || Spacewatch || — || align=right | 2.9 km || 
|-id=892 bgcolor=#d6d6d6
| 361892 ||  || — || March 27, 2008 || Kitt Peak || Spacewatch || — || align=right | 3.1 km || 
|-id=893 bgcolor=#d6d6d6
| 361893 ||  || — || August 6, 2004 || Palomar || NEAT || — || align=right | 3.5 km || 
|-id=894 bgcolor=#d6d6d6
| 361894 ||  || — || March 30, 2008 || Kitt Peak || Spacewatch || — || align=right | 3.0 km || 
|-id=895 bgcolor=#d6d6d6
| 361895 ||  || — || March 30, 2008 || Kitt Peak || Spacewatch || — || align=right | 2.4 km || 
|-id=896 bgcolor=#d6d6d6
| 361896 ||  || — || March 30, 2008 || Kitt Peak || Spacewatch || EOS || align=right | 1.7 km || 
|-id=897 bgcolor=#d6d6d6
| 361897 ||  || — || February 13, 2008 || Mount Lemmon || Mount Lemmon Survey || — || align=right | 2.6 km || 
|-id=898 bgcolor=#E9E9E9
| 361898 ||  || — || April 1, 2008 || Kitt Peak || Spacewatch || MRX || align=right | 1.0 km || 
|-id=899 bgcolor=#E9E9E9
| 361899 ||  || — || April 3, 2008 || Mount Lemmon || Mount Lemmon Survey || — || align=right | 2.5 km || 
|-id=900 bgcolor=#d6d6d6
| 361900 ||  || — || April 3, 2008 || Kitt Peak || Spacewatch || — || align=right | 2.9 km || 
|}

361901–362000 

|-bgcolor=#d6d6d6
| 361901 ||  || — || April 4, 2008 || Kitt Peak || Spacewatch || — || align=right | 4.2 km || 
|-id=902 bgcolor=#d6d6d6
| 361902 ||  || — || April 3, 2008 || Kitt Peak || Spacewatch || — || align=right | 2.6 km || 
|-id=903 bgcolor=#d6d6d6
| 361903 ||  || — || April 3, 2008 || Mount Lemmon || Mount Lemmon Survey || — || align=right | 3.2 km || 
|-id=904 bgcolor=#d6d6d6
| 361904 ||  || — || April 3, 2008 || Kitt Peak || Spacewatch || — || align=right | 3.8 km || 
|-id=905 bgcolor=#d6d6d6
| 361905 ||  || — || April 3, 2008 || Kitt Peak || Spacewatch || THM || align=right | 2.1 km || 
|-id=906 bgcolor=#d6d6d6
| 361906 ||  || — || April 4, 2008 || Kitt Peak || Spacewatch || — || align=right | 3.2 km || 
|-id=907 bgcolor=#d6d6d6
| 361907 ||  || — || April 4, 2008 || Kitt Peak || Spacewatch || — || align=right | 3.4 km || 
|-id=908 bgcolor=#d6d6d6
| 361908 ||  || — || April 4, 2008 || Kitt Peak || Spacewatch || — || align=right | 3.8 km || 
|-id=909 bgcolor=#d6d6d6
| 361909 ||  || — || August 25, 2004 || Kitt Peak || Spacewatch || EOS || align=right | 1.9 km || 
|-id=910 bgcolor=#d6d6d6
| 361910 ||  || — || March 28, 2008 || Mount Lemmon || Mount Lemmon Survey || EMA || align=right | 4.3 km || 
|-id=911 bgcolor=#d6d6d6
| 361911 ||  || — || April 6, 2008 || Kitt Peak || Spacewatch || TIR || align=right | 2.6 km || 
|-id=912 bgcolor=#d6d6d6
| 361912 ||  || — || April 6, 2008 || Kitt Peak || Spacewatch || — || align=right | 3.4 km || 
|-id=913 bgcolor=#d6d6d6
| 361913 ||  || — || November 21, 2005 || Kitt Peak || Spacewatch || — || align=right | 3.0 km || 
|-id=914 bgcolor=#d6d6d6
| 361914 ||  || — || April 4, 2008 || Kitt Peak || Spacewatch || — || align=right | 3.4 km || 
|-id=915 bgcolor=#d6d6d6
| 361915 ||  || — || April 8, 2008 || Kitt Peak || Spacewatch || — || align=right | 3.4 km || 
|-id=916 bgcolor=#d6d6d6
| 361916 ||  || — || April 8, 2008 || Kitt Peak || Spacewatch || — || align=right | 3.4 km || 
|-id=917 bgcolor=#d6d6d6
| 361917 ||  || — || April 10, 2008 || Kitt Peak || Spacewatch || HYG || align=right | 3.6 km || 
|-id=918 bgcolor=#d6d6d6
| 361918 ||  || — || April 10, 2008 || Kitt Peak || Spacewatch || — || align=right | 2.9 km || 
|-id=919 bgcolor=#E9E9E9
| 361919 ||  || — || April 11, 2008 || Kitt Peak || Spacewatch || — || align=right | 2.4 km || 
|-id=920 bgcolor=#E9E9E9
| 361920 ||  || — || April 1, 2008 || Catalina || CSS || — || align=right | 3.1 km || 
|-id=921 bgcolor=#fefefe
| 361921 ||  || — || April 13, 2008 || Catalina || CSS || H || align=right data-sort-value="0.67" | 670 m || 
|-id=922 bgcolor=#d6d6d6
| 361922 ||  || — || April 13, 2008 || Kitt Peak || Spacewatch || — || align=right | 5.0 km || 
|-id=923 bgcolor=#d6d6d6
| 361923 ||  || — || April 14, 2008 || Mount Lemmon || Mount Lemmon Survey || — || align=right | 3.1 km || 
|-id=924 bgcolor=#d6d6d6
| 361924 ||  || — || April 14, 2008 || Mount Lemmon || Mount Lemmon Survey || EOS || align=right | 2.1 km || 
|-id=925 bgcolor=#d6d6d6
| 361925 ||  || — || April 13, 2008 || Mount Lemmon || Mount Lemmon Survey || — || align=right | 4.4 km || 
|-id=926 bgcolor=#d6d6d6
| 361926 ||  || — || April 14, 2008 || Mount Lemmon || Mount Lemmon Survey || — || align=right | 3.5 km || 
|-id=927 bgcolor=#d6d6d6
| 361927 ||  || — || April 15, 2008 || Mount Lemmon || Mount Lemmon Survey || — || align=right | 3.0 km || 
|-id=928 bgcolor=#d6d6d6
| 361928 ||  || — || April 13, 2008 || Mount Lemmon || Mount Lemmon Survey || — || align=right | 3.6 km || 
|-id=929 bgcolor=#d6d6d6
| 361929 ||  || — || April 12, 2008 || Kitt Peak || Spacewatch || — || align=right | 3.3 km || 
|-id=930 bgcolor=#d6d6d6
| 361930 ||  || — || April 9, 2008 || Kitt Peak || Spacewatch || — || align=right | 2.3 km || 
|-id=931 bgcolor=#d6d6d6
| 361931 ||  || — || April 14, 2008 || Mount Lemmon || Mount Lemmon Survey || — || align=right | 3.3 km || 
|-id=932 bgcolor=#d6d6d6
| 361932 ||  || — || April 24, 2008 || Kitt Peak || Spacewatch || — || align=right | 2.3 km || 
|-id=933 bgcolor=#d6d6d6
| 361933 ||  || — || April 24, 2008 || Kitt Peak || Spacewatch || TIR || align=right | 3.3 km || 
|-id=934 bgcolor=#d6d6d6
| 361934 ||  || — || April 25, 2008 || Kitt Peak || Spacewatch || IMH || align=right | 3.8 km || 
|-id=935 bgcolor=#d6d6d6
| 361935 ||  || — || April 26, 2008 || Kitt Peak || Spacewatch || — || align=right | 3.7 km || 
|-id=936 bgcolor=#d6d6d6
| 361936 ||  || — || April 27, 2008 || Kitt Peak || Spacewatch || — || align=right | 2.9 km || 
|-id=937 bgcolor=#d6d6d6
| 361937 ||  || — || April 27, 2008 || Mount Lemmon || Mount Lemmon Survey || — || align=right | 3.5 km || 
|-id=938 bgcolor=#d6d6d6
| 361938 ||  || — || April 26, 2008 || Kitt Peak || Spacewatch || EUP || align=right | 3.3 km || 
|-id=939 bgcolor=#d6d6d6
| 361939 ||  || — || April 26, 2008 || Mount Lemmon || Mount Lemmon Survey || CHA || align=right | 1.6 km || 
|-id=940 bgcolor=#d6d6d6
| 361940 ||  || — || April 16, 2008 || Mount Lemmon || Mount Lemmon Survey || — || align=right | 2.8 km || 
|-id=941 bgcolor=#d6d6d6
| 361941 ||  || — || April 29, 2008 || Kitt Peak || Spacewatch || — || align=right | 3.4 km || 
|-id=942 bgcolor=#d6d6d6
| 361942 ||  || — || April 29, 2008 || Mount Lemmon || Mount Lemmon Survey || — || align=right | 2.0 km || 
|-id=943 bgcolor=#d6d6d6
| 361943 ||  || — || April 1, 2008 || Kitt Peak || Spacewatch || — || align=right | 2.9 km || 
|-id=944 bgcolor=#d6d6d6
| 361944 ||  || — || April 29, 2008 || Kitt Peak || Spacewatch || EOS || align=right | 2.2 km || 
|-id=945 bgcolor=#d6d6d6
| 361945 ||  || — || April 30, 2008 || Kitt Peak || Spacewatch || — || align=right | 3.3 km || 
|-id=946 bgcolor=#d6d6d6
| 361946 ||  || — || April 30, 2008 || Mount Lemmon || Mount Lemmon Survey || — || align=right | 3.0 km || 
|-id=947 bgcolor=#d6d6d6
| 361947 ||  || — || April 30, 2008 || Kitt Peak || Spacewatch || TIR || align=right | 2.3 km || 
|-id=948 bgcolor=#d6d6d6
| 361948 ||  || — || April 30, 2008 || Kitt Peak || Spacewatch || — || align=right | 3.1 km || 
|-id=949 bgcolor=#d6d6d6
| 361949 ||  || — || April 30, 2008 || Kitt Peak || Spacewatch || — || align=right | 3.2 km || 
|-id=950 bgcolor=#d6d6d6
| 361950 ||  || — || April 29, 2008 || Mount Lemmon || Mount Lemmon Survey || EOS || align=right | 2.1 km || 
|-id=951 bgcolor=#d6d6d6
| 361951 ||  || — || January 24, 2007 || Mount Lemmon || Mount Lemmon Survey || — || align=right | 2.9 km || 
|-id=952 bgcolor=#E9E9E9
| 361952 ||  || — || May 3, 2008 || Mount Lemmon || Mount Lemmon Survey || — || align=right | 2.6 km || 
|-id=953 bgcolor=#d6d6d6
| 361953 ||  || — || May 1, 2008 || Catalina || CSS || — || align=right | 3.3 km || 
|-id=954 bgcolor=#d6d6d6
| 361954 ||  || — || May 2, 2008 || Kitt Peak || Spacewatch || EOS || align=right | 2.0 km || 
|-id=955 bgcolor=#d6d6d6
| 361955 ||  || — || April 3, 2008 || Mount Lemmon || Mount Lemmon Survey || — || align=right | 4.1 km || 
|-id=956 bgcolor=#d6d6d6
| 361956 ||  || — || January 26, 2007 || Kitt Peak || Spacewatch || — || align=right | 3.0 km || 
|-id=957 bgcolor=#d6d6d6
| 361957 ||  || — || May 3, 2008 || Catalina || CSS || EUP || align=right | 4.6 km || 
|-id=958 bgcolor=#d6d6d6
| 361958 ||  || — || May 4, 2008 || Kitt Peak || Spacewatch || — || align=right | 2.9 km || 
|-id=959 bgcolor=#d6d6d6
| 361959 ||  || — || April 14, 2008 || Mount Lemmon || Mount Lemmon Survey || — || align=right | 3.5 km || 
|-id=960 bgcolor=#d6d6d6
| 361960 ||  || — || May 4, 2008 || Kitt Peak || Spacewatch || — || align=right | 2.9 km || 
|-id=961 bgcolor=#d6d6d6
| 361961 ||  || — || May 4, 2008 || Kitt Peak || Spacewatch || — || align=right | 3.6 km || 
|-id=962 bgcolor=#d6d6d6
| 361962 ||  || — || April 5, 2002 || Palomar || NEAT || — || align=right | 3.2 km || 
|-id=963 bgcolor=#d6d6d6
| 361963 ||  || — || May 6, 2008 || Kitt Peak || Spacewatch || — || align=right | 2.5 km || 
|-id=964 bgcolor=#d6d6d6
| 361964 ||  || — || May 11, 2008 || Kitt Peak || Spacewatch || — || align=right | 2.6 km || 
|-id=965 bgcolor=#d6d6d6
| 361965 ||  || — || May 5, 2008 || Kitt Peak || Spacewatch || EOS || align=right | 2.3 km || 
|-id=966 bgcolor=#d6d6d6
| 361966 ||  || — || May 6, 2008 || Mount Lemmon || Mount Lemmon Survey || EOS || align=right | 2.5 km || 
|-id=967 bgcolor=#d6d6d6
| 361967 ||  || — || May 8, 2008 || Mount Lemmon || Mount Lemmon Survey || — || align=right | 3.5 km || 
|-id=968 bgcolor=#d6d6d6
| 361968 ||  || — || May 3, 2008 || Kitt Peak || Spacewatch || — || align=right | 3.8 km || 
|-id=969 bgcolor=#d6d6d6
| 361969 ||  || — || May 14, 2008 || Mount Lemmon || Mount Lemmon Survey || — || align=right | 5.1 km || 
|-id=970 bgcolor=#d6d6d6
| 361970 ||  || — || May 6, 2008 || Mount Lemmon || Mount Lemmon Survey || EOS || align=right | 1.8 km || 
|-id=971 bgcolor=#fefefe
| 361971 ||  || — || May 26, 2008 || Kitt Peak || Spacewatch || H || align=right data-sort-value="0.76" | 760 m || 
|-id=972 bgcolor=#d6d6d6
| 361972 ||  || — || April 30, 2008 || Mount Lemmon || Mount Lemmon Survey || — || align=right | 3.5 km || 
|-id=973 bgcolor=#d6d6d6
| 361973 ||  || — || May 29, 2008 || Mount Lemmon || Mount Lemmon Survey || — || align=right | 2.6 km || 
|-id=974 bgcolor=#d6d6d6
| 361974 ||  || — || May 26, 2008 || Kitt Peak || Spacewatch || — || align=right | 3.5 km || 
|-id=975 bgcolor=#d6d6d6
| 361975 ||  || — || May 27, 2008 || Kitt Peak || Spacewatch || — || align=right | 3.3 km || 
|-id=976 bgcolor=#d6d6d6
| 361976 ||  || — || May 27, 2008 || Kitt Peak || Spacewatch || EOS || align=right | 1.9 km || 
|-id=977 bgcolor=#d6d6d6
| 361977 ||  || — || May 16, 2008 || Kitt Peak || Spacewatch || EOS || align=right | 2.1 km || 
|-id=978 bgcolor=#d6d6d6
| 361978 ||  || — || October 9, 2004 || Kitt Peak || Spacewatch || — || align=right | 3.0 km || 
|-id=979 bgcolor=#d6d6d6
| 361979 ||  || — || May 29, 2008 || Kitt Peak || Spacewatch || — || align=right | 3.2 km || 
|-id=980 bgcolor=#d6d6d6
| 361980 ||  || — || December 27, 2006 || Mount Lemmon || Mount Lemmon Survey || — || align=right | 3.4 km || 
|-id=981 bgcolor=#d6d6d6
| 361981 ||  || — || May 31, 2008 || Mount Lemmon || Mount Lemmon Survey || — || align=right | 3.4 km || 
|-id=982 bgcolor=#d6d6d6
| 361982 ||  || — || April 11, 2008 || Kitt Peak || Spacewatch || — || align=right | 2.8 km || 
|-id=983 bgcolor=#d6d6d6
| 361983 ||  || — || April 30, 2008 || Mount Lemmon || Mount Lemmon Survey || — || align=right | 3.1 km || 
|-id=984 bgcolor=#fefefe
| 361984 ||  || — || June 9, 2008 || Farra d'Isonzo || Farra d'Isonzo || H || align=right data-sort-value="0.69" | 690 m || 
|-id=985 bgcolor=#d6d6d6
| 361985 ||  || — || June 7, 2008 || Kitt Peak || Spacewatch || LIX || align=right | 3.4 km || 
|-id=986 bgcolor=#d6d6d6
| 361986 ||  || — || June 8, 2008 || Kitt Peak || Spacewatch || VER || align=right | 2.7 km || 
|-id=987 bgcolor=#d6d6d6
| 361987 ||  || — || May 5, 2008 || Kitt Peak || Spacewatch || — || align=right | 3.2 km || 
|-id=988 bgcolor=#d6d6d6
| 361988 ||  || — || July 11, 2008 || Siding Spring || SSS || — || align=right | 6.6 km || 
|-id=989 bgcolor=#d6d6d6
| 361989 ||  || — || August 27, 2008 || Dauban || F. Kugel || — || align=right | 2.7 km || 
|-id=990 bgcolor=#d6d6d6
| 361990 ||  || — || September 2, 2008 || Goodricke-Pigott || R. A. Tucker || — || align=right | 4.5 km || 
|-id=991 bgcolor=#d6d6d6
| 361991 ||  || — || September 6, 2008 || Kitt Peak || Spacewatch || SHU3:2 || align=right | 5.1 km || 
|-id=992 bgcolor=#d6d6d6
| 361992 ||  || — || September 21, 2008 || Kitt Peak || Spacewatch || — || align=right | 3.4 km || 
|-id=993 bgcolor=#fefefe
| 361993 ||  || — || September 22, 2008 || Kitt Peak || Spacewatch || — || align=right data-sort-value="0.67" | 670 m || 
|-id=994 bgcolor=#fefefe
| 361994 ||  || — || September 26, 2008 || Kitt Peak || Spacewatch || — || align=right data-sort-value="0.77" | 770 m || 
|-id=995 bgcolor=#fefefe
| 361995 ||  || — || September 27, 2008 || Mount Lemmon || Mount Lemmon Survey || FLO || align=right data-sort-value="0.64" | 640 m || 
|-id=996 bgcolor=#fefefe
| 361996 ||  || — || September 24, 2008 || Kitt Peak || Spacewatch || — || align=right data-sort-value="0.72" | 720 m || 
|-id=997 bgcolor=#fefefe
| 361997 ||  || — || September 23, 2008 || Kitt Peak || Spacewatch || — || align=right data-sort-value="0.63" | 630 m || 
|-id=998 bgcolor=#fefefe
| 361998 ||  || — || October 4, 2008 || La Sagra || OAM Obs. || — || align=right data-sort-value="0.77" | 770 m || 
|-id=999 bgcolor=#C2FFFF
| 361999 ||  || — || October 6, 2008 || Kitt Peak || Spacewatch || L4ERY || align=right | 9.1 km || 
|-id=000 bgcolor=#fefefe
| 362000 ||  || — || October 6, 2008 || Kitt Peak || Spacewatch || — || align=right data-sort-value="0.65" | 650 m || 
|}

References

External links 
 Discovery Circumstances: Numbered Minor Planets (360001)–(365000) (IAU Minor Planet Center)

0361